= Dunscore Old Kirk =

- Dunscore Old Kirk and burial ground
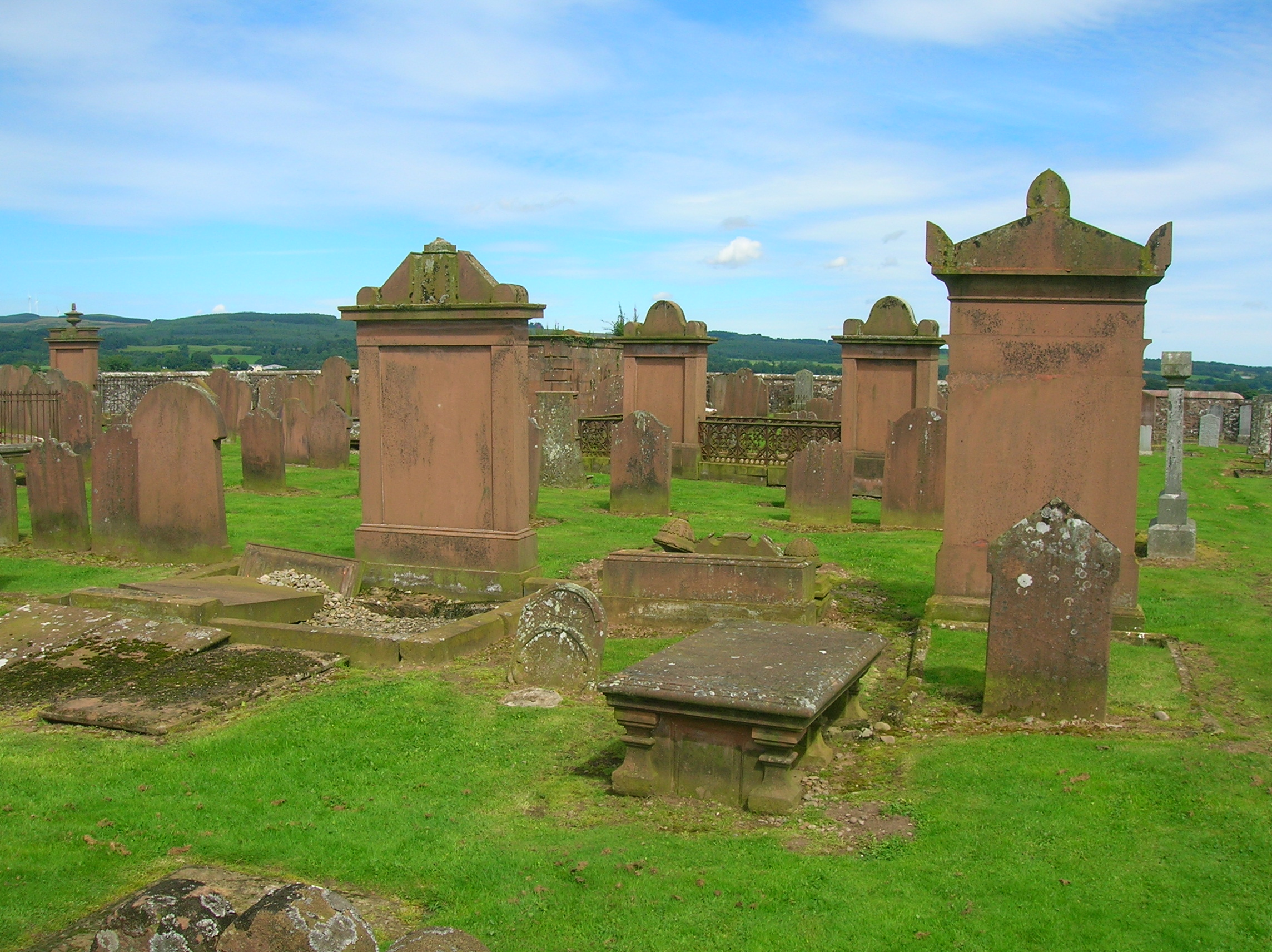
- General view of Dunscore Old Kirk burial ground
- Dunscore Old Kirk
- Location: Merkland, Dumfries and Galloway
- Country: Scotland
- Denomination: Protestant

History
- Former name: Kirk of Dunscore
- Status: Replaced by Dunscore Kirk
- Founded: 13th century
- Events: Significant links with Robert Burns

Architecture
- Functional status: Cemetery in use in 2000
- Heritage designation: Category B listed
- Closed: 1645

Specifications
- Materials: Dressed red sandstone and rubble

Administration
- Parish: Dunscore

Dunscore Old Kirk (NGR NX 92661 83241) was a pre-Reformation kirk (church) situated on rising ground off a minor road to Merkland, Parish of Dunscore, Dumfriesshire, Dumfries and Galloway, Scotland; about 3 km from Auldgirth. The church was known locally as the Kirk of Dunscore; it lies close to Fardingwell Farm and was between Isle Tower and Ellisland of Robert Burns, in the eastern part of the Civil Parish of Dunscore.

No identifiable remains of the church can now be seen.

The churchyard, consecrated ground, continues to be used for the inhabitants of the local farms, Isle Tower, Friars Carse, etc.

== History ==
About AD1170 the original place of worship was established by a Norman lord. The land was gifted to the Abbey of Holywood by the Cistercian monks of Melrose. The monks played an important part in developing the area by improving the drainage, growing new crops and by promoting animal husbandry at such places the Friars' Carse grange and elsewhere.

In AD1257 the first mention of the church occurs in a monastic dispute, and then again in 1412.

Clearly shown on Timothy Pont's map of circa 1600 as 'Kirk of Dunscore',

In 1645 it was recorded that the church was so ruinous and its position so peripheral to the parish that it was decided to build a new church at what is now known as Dunscore.

== The Old Kirk burial ground ==
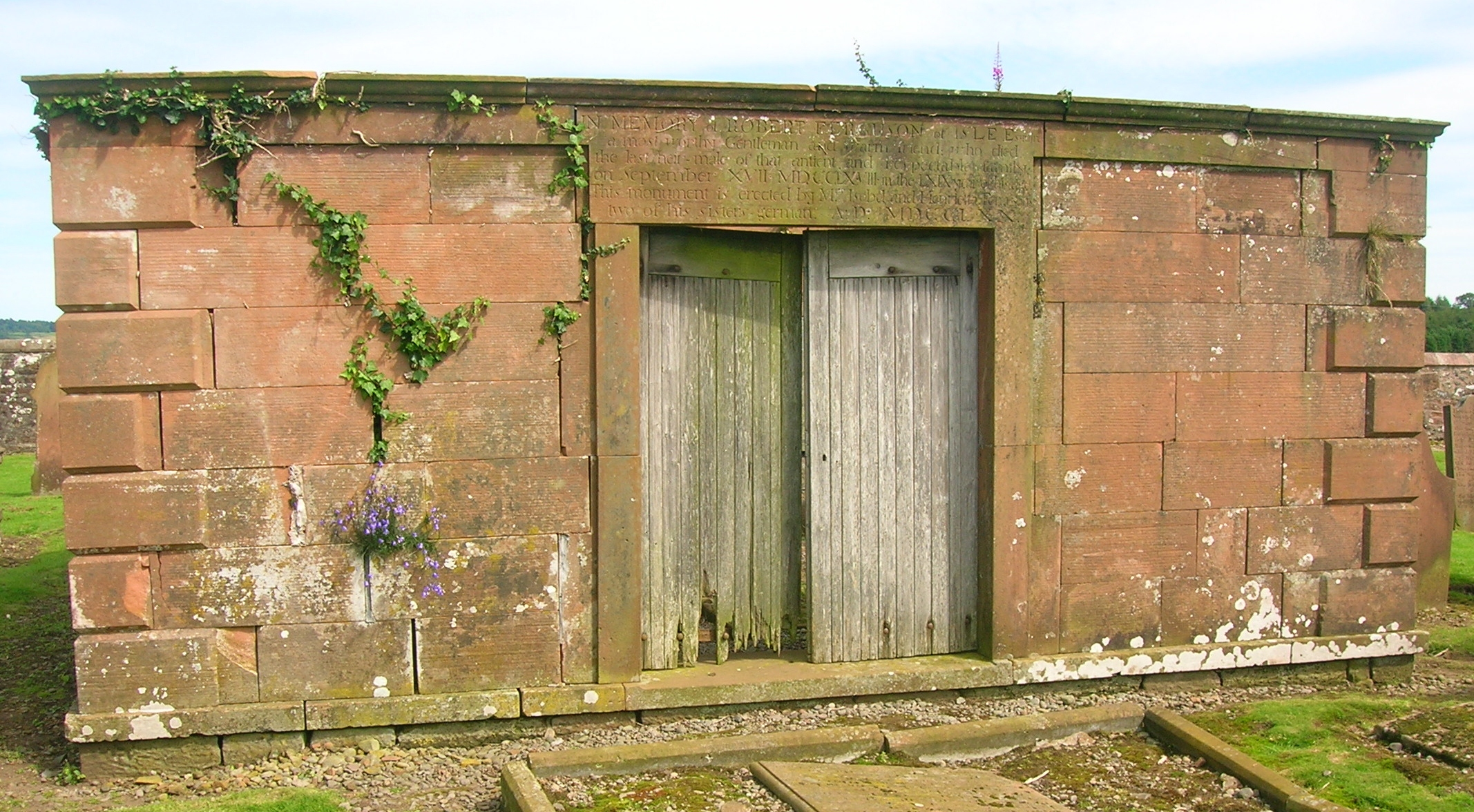
The Fergusson of Isle mausoleum.

The 1855 OS map shows a rectangular grave yard in the fields off a minor road to the north of Fardingwell Farm. A track runs up to the enclosure and ends at a rectangular area next to the 'Laird of Lag's Tomb'. The site is now enclosed within a well built stone wall. Trees are shown encircling the cemetery in 1855.

The largest structure is now the mausoleum of the Ferguson family of the nearby Isle Tower. The dedication inscription reads "In memory of Robert Ferguson of Isle Esq. a most worthy gentleman and warm friend: who died the last heir-male of that antient and respectable family on September XVII MDCCLXVII (AD1767) in the LXIX year of his age. This monument is erected by Mrs. Isobel and Henrietta Ferguson, two of his sisters-german. A:D: MDCCLXX. (AD1770)"

A number of the larger burial plots are still demarcated by cast iron railings, usually removed during the WW2 but retained in this remote spot.

=== Robert Burns links ===
Dunscore old Kirk burial ground is associated with Robert Burns through the presence of the tomb of Robert Riddell of Glenriddell.

Robert Burns and his family lived at nearby Ellisland Farm (1788 to 1791) and for some years the poet was on good terms with Robert Riddell of Glenriddell (now Friars' Carse), having the use of the 'Hermitage' at Glenriddell House (sic), etc. The friendship was broken following an act of inappropriate behaviour by Burns and Robert Riddell died before the friendship could be re-established.

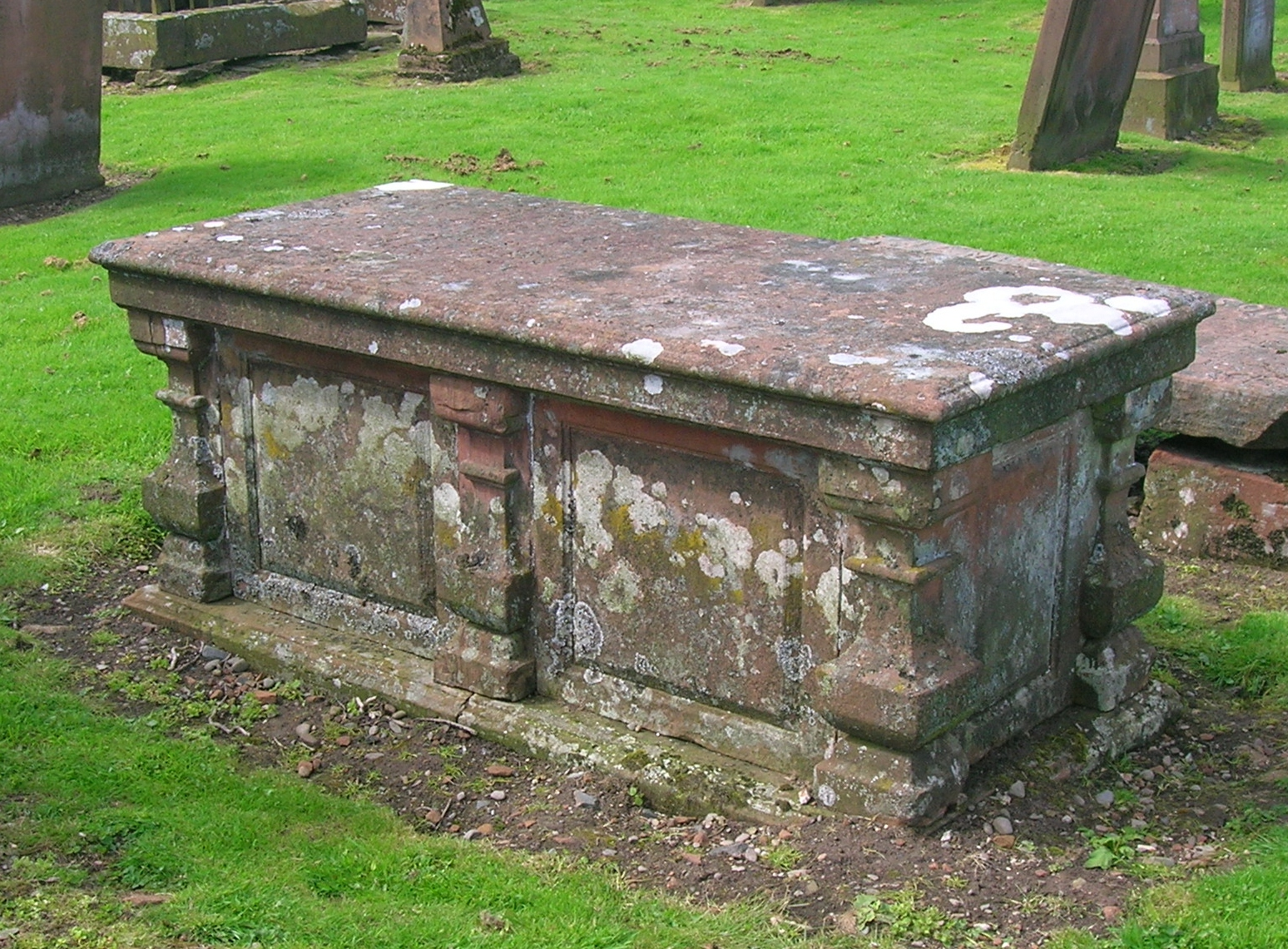
Robert Riddell's grave.

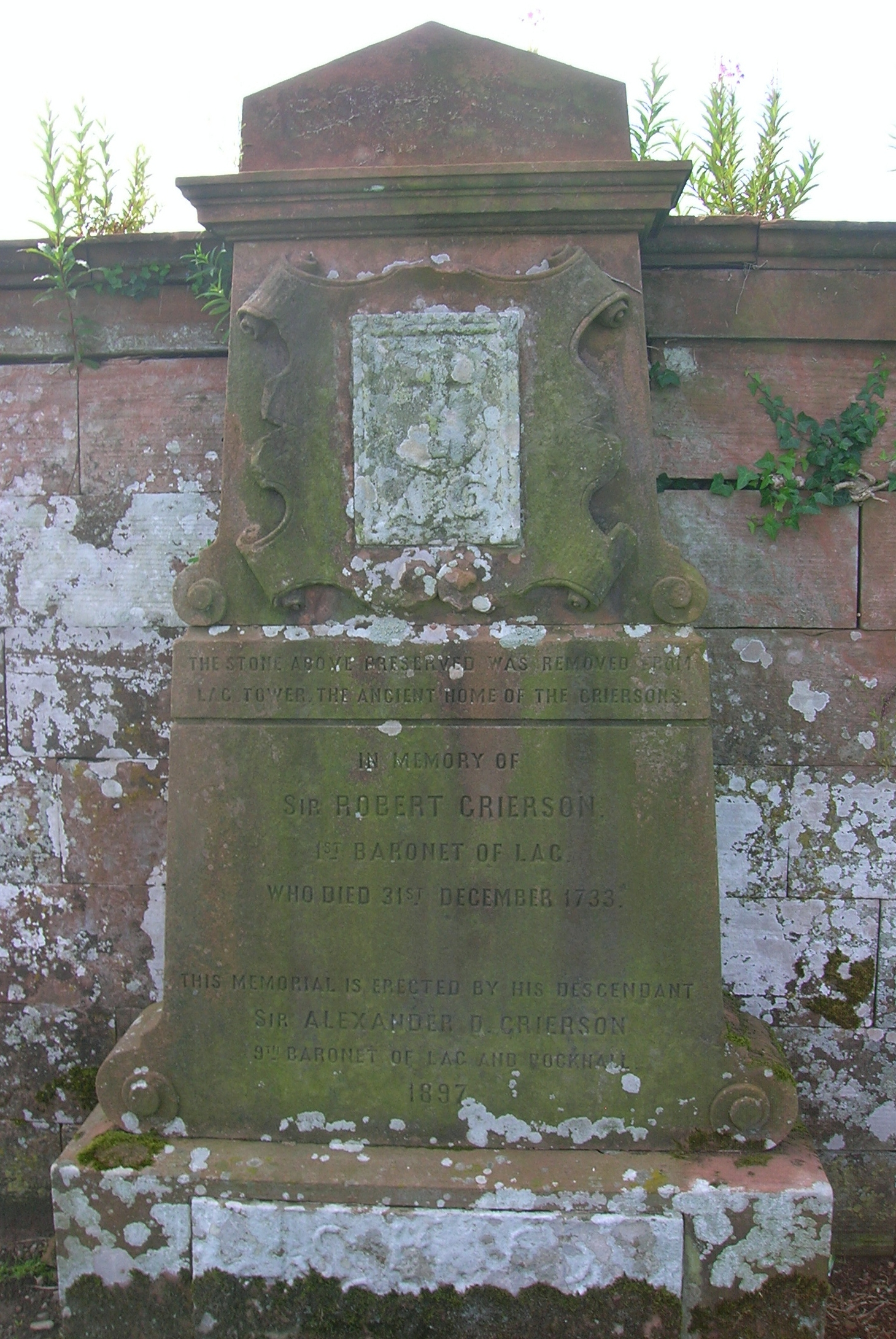
'Cruel Lag's' memorial at Dunscore Old Kirk.

=== 'Cruel Lag' and the Covenanters ===
Dunscore old Kirk burial ground is associated with the Covenanters through the presence of the memorial to Sir Robert Grierson the 'Cruel Lag' persecutor of local adherents to the Covenant. The Laird of Lag's (Sir Robert Grierson) Tomb is located (NX 9267 8323) within the burial ground of the family, standing against the back wall of the mausoleum of the Ferguson's of Isle Tower. The inscription on the gravestone states that it the inset coat of arms of the Grierson family was moved to this site from old Lag Tower and gives the date of Sir Robert Grierson's death as 1733; the earliest Grierson memorial is dated 1656.

The remains of Lag Tower are located at (NX 8802 8618). It is a 16th-century tower and was the possession of the Grierson family.

== The New Kirk ==
In 1649, James Grierson of Dalgonar and James Kirko of Sundaywell presented a petition to the Scots Parliament, seeking to move the kirk to its present site in Dunscore.

The old Kirk at this time was said to be so ruinous that "they daere not for hazard of their life repaire thearto for Godis worship".

James Grierson granted a feu on the land, and the new kirk was built on the site it still occupies, although it has been rebuilt here a second time. The village of Dunscore was at this time called Cottack.

The copper baptismal font was brought from the old Kirk, and secreted in one of the walls. The Revd. Robt. Archibald was the first minister in the new Kirk. In 1923 the baptismal font taken out of the wall, and set up on its present stand. Another link is a carved red sandstone block bearing the date 1649 and the inscription "How amiable are thy tabernacles, O Lord of Hosts to me"..

== See also ==
- Friars Carse
- Carse Loch
- Kirkbride
