= Friars Carse =

Friars' Carse
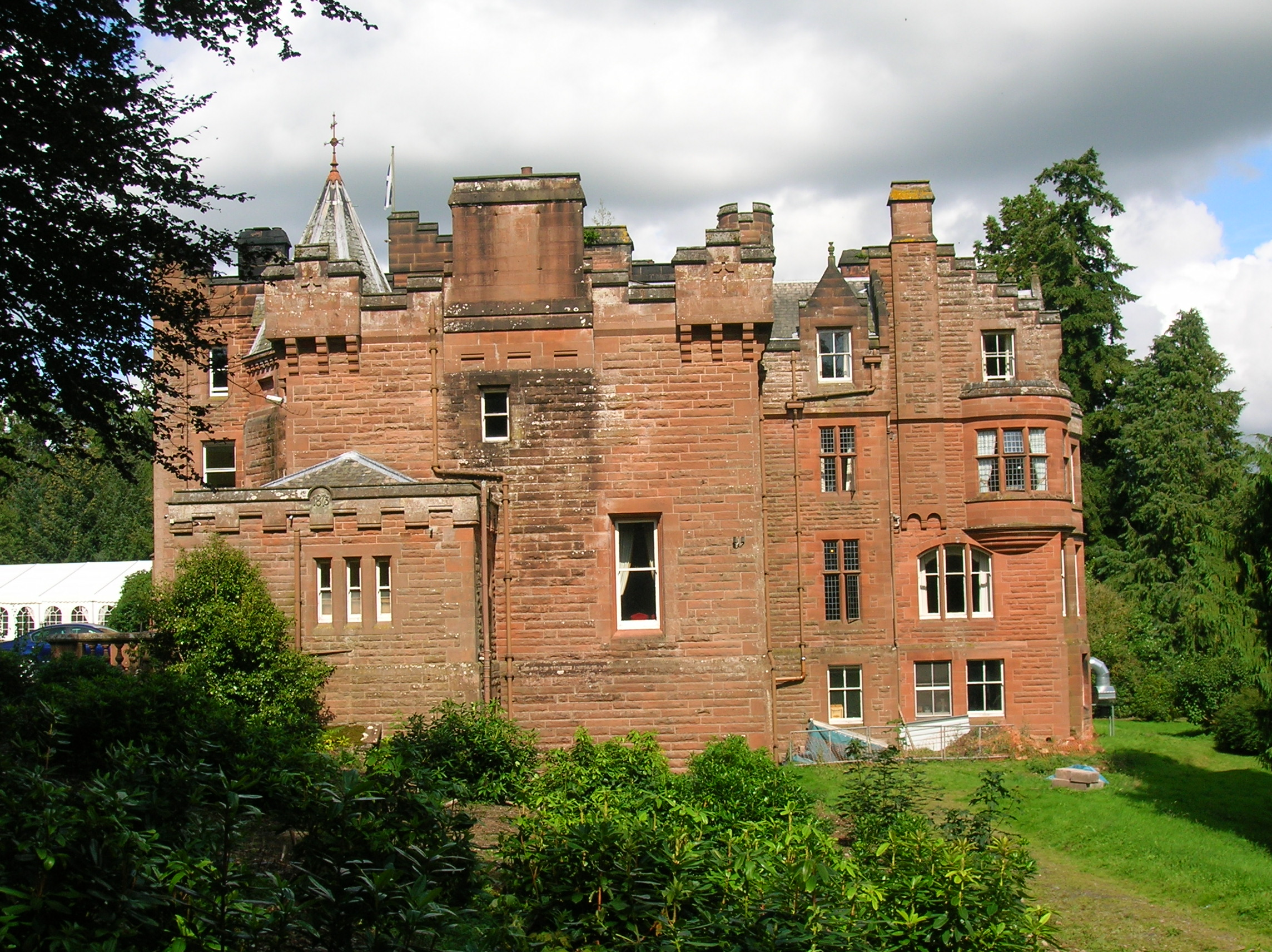
- Friars' Carse

- Location of Friar's Carse in Dumfries and Galloway
- 55.1476°N 3.68744°W
- Location: Auldgirth, Dumfries

History
- Built: 1771, rebuilt 1873, extended 1909
- Built for: Robert Riddell

Site notes
- Architect(s): Barbour and Bowie (1873, 1909)
- Architectural style: Scots Baronial

Listed Building – Category B
- Official name: Friars Carse former Stables including Beech Cottage
- Designated: 26 June 1986
- Reference no.: LB4234

Friars' Carse is a mansion house and estate situated (NX 926 850) 2 kilometres (1.2 mi) southeast of Auldgirth on the main road (A76) to Dumfries, Parish of Dunscore, Scotland. The property is located on the west bank of the River Nith and is known for its strong associations with Robert Burns who lived for a while at the nearby Ellisland farm. The mansion house is unlisted, however the stables and hermitage are Category B listed buildings.

== The house and policies ==
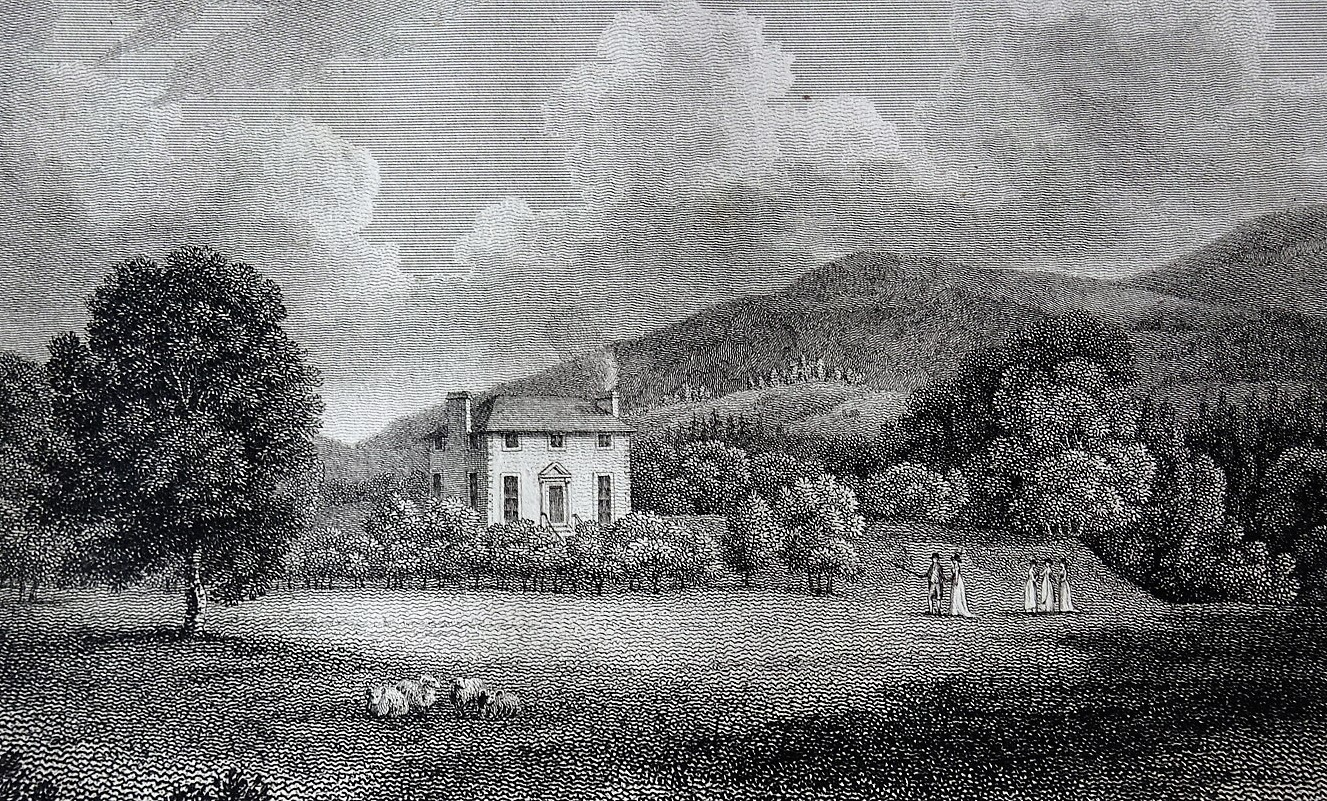
Friars' Carse, Auldgirth, Nithsdale in 1805

The present mansion house hotel is of a baronial style in dressed red sandstone, constructed around an earlier house in 1873 by the architects Barbour and Bowie and extended by the same architects 1905 – 09. The principal (south-east) range has a complex wide faced frontage and incorporates a peculiar round tower with a rectangular second stage corbelled out above. An armorial panel dated 1598 was built into the entrance tower range in 1909. The house has a fine panelled entrance hall and snooker room, together with an elegant staircase and 21 en suite bedrooms; it is placed within 18.2 ha (45 acres) of parkland and woodland.

The name Friars' Carse derives from a monastic settlement which was established nearby by the Cistercian monks of Melrose in the 13th century. Carse Loch is located nearby and was once used as the monastic fish pond and its crannog was used as a hiding place for valuables during times of war or raids. The present punctuation convention for Friars Carse, with or without the apostrophe, is at variance with the older convention of Friars' Carse; the 'Carse of the Friars'.

By the 16th century, there was a tower here, with a cap-house surrounded by a prominent parapet (see engraving). In the 17th and 18th centuries, this was extended to include lodgings with crow-stepped gables, enclosed within a courtyard. In 1771 Robert Riddell pulled down the old and ruinous buildings to create room for a new mansion. Frances Grose recorded that on his visit in 1789 the monks' refectory still stood with walls eight foot thick and a twelve foot wide fireplace.

The stables and Beech Cottage

These estate buildings date mostly from the early 19th century, however the principal (south east) range side was re-modelled circa 1873, with a tall 2-stage tower built above. the Stables consist of four single storey ranges built around a quadrangular court. The pend beneath the tower is placed centrally and a gabled dovecot or doocot is present.

=== The Riddells ===
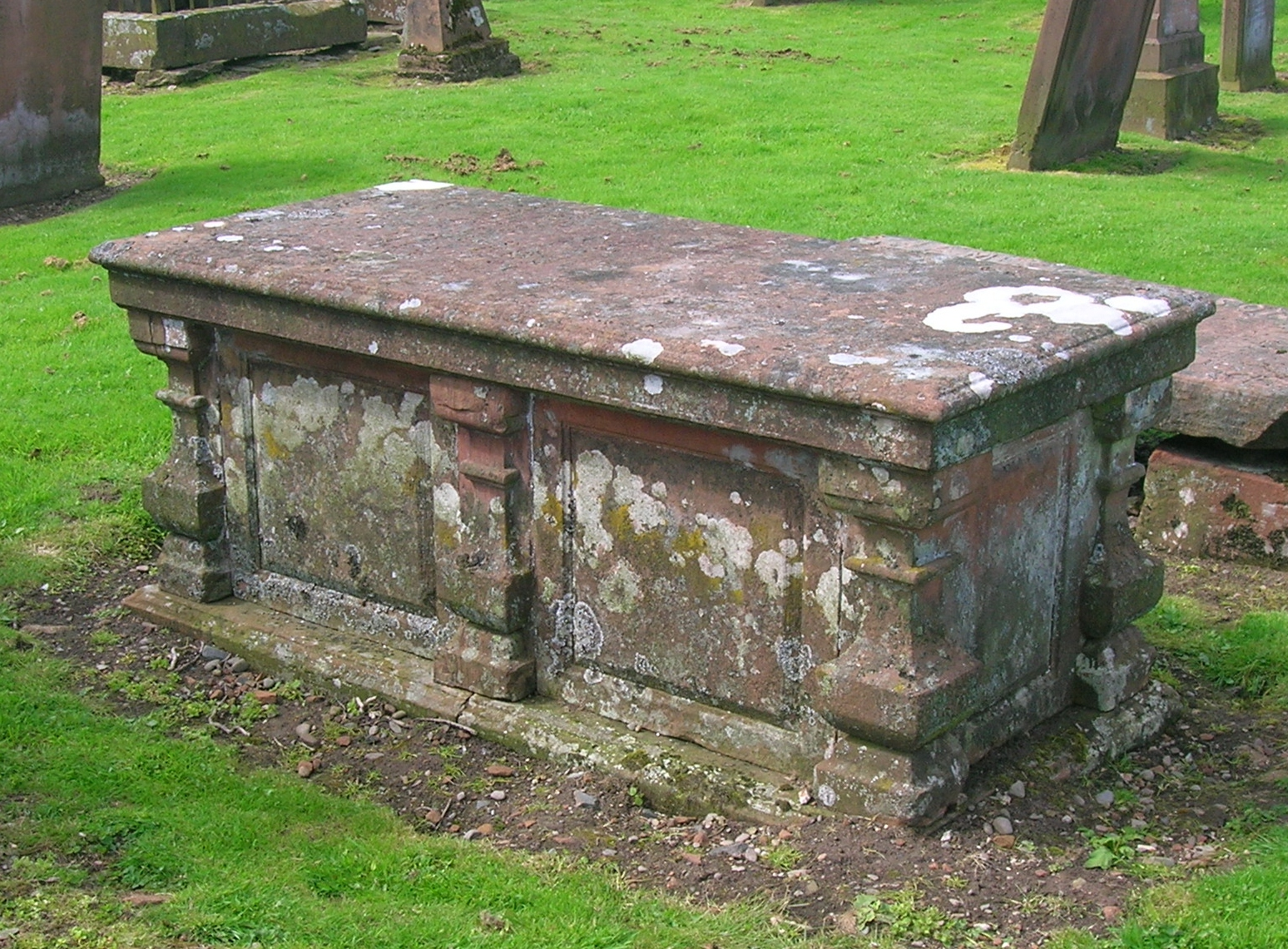
Robert Riddell's tomb at Dunscore Old Kirk burial ground.

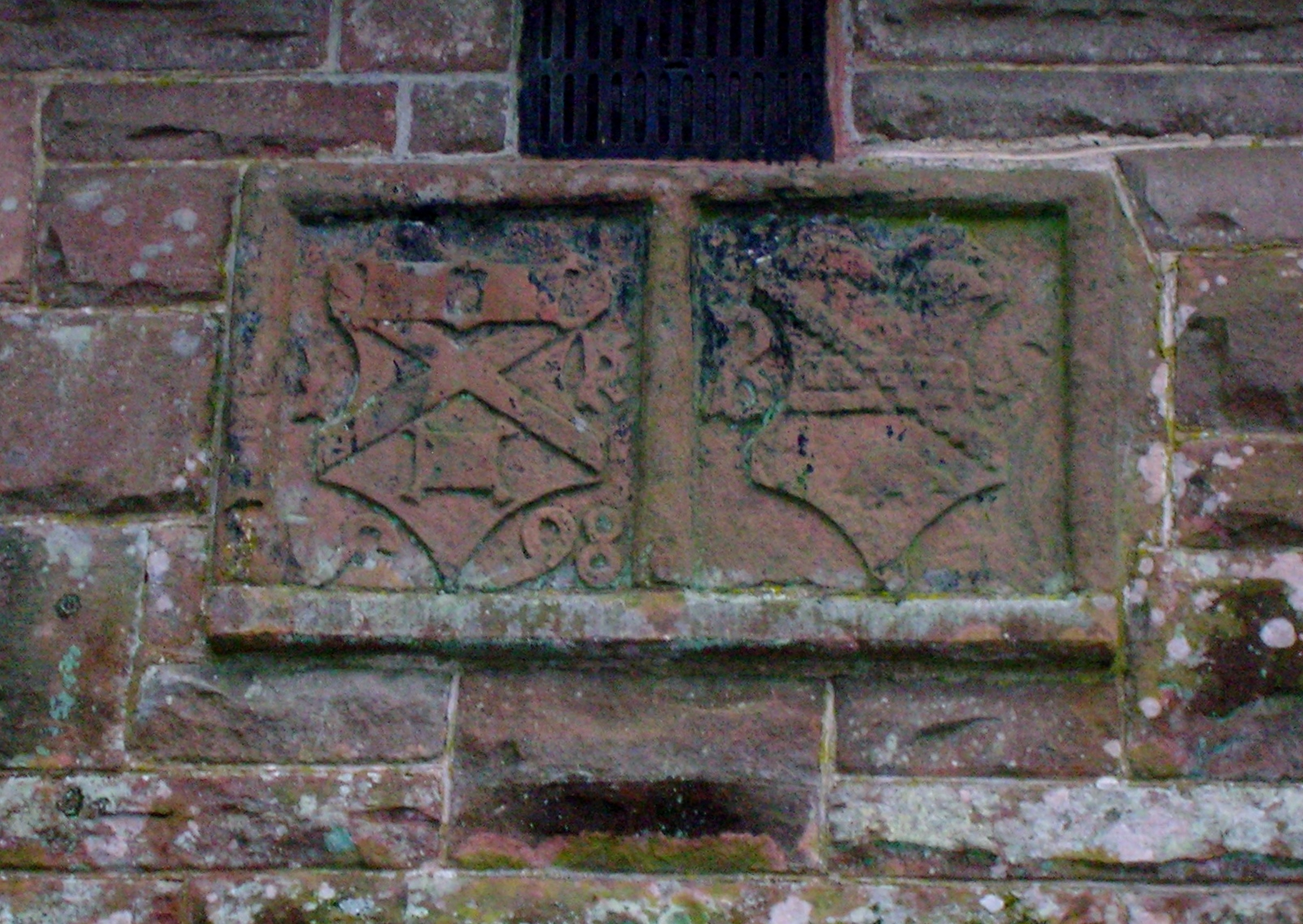
A Riddell family marriage stone dated 1598 now located in the wall of Beech Cottage, Friars Carse stables.

In the 17th century William Riddell, son of a Nova Scotia baronet, from Roxburghshire purchased the lands of Friars' Carse. The older buildings were replaced by a more modest Georgian mansion, known as Glenriddell, built 1771–73 for Robert Riddell or Riddel, a friend and patron of the poet Robert Burns (1759–96).

McKay records that Walter Riddell of Newhouse, grandfather of Robert, married his cousin Anne and through her inherited the estate of Glenriddell that her family had held since not long after the reformation and the concurrent secularisation of the lands held by Melrose Abbey.

On Robert Riddell's death in 1794, his widow could have allowed the property to go to Walter Riddell, her brother in law, who, under the terms of his brother's will, would then merely have had to pay her an annuity to retain the estate. Robert's widow disliked Walter Riddell to such an extent that she refused to exercise this option and the property was sold, passing out of the family's hands. Walter was wealthy in his own right, having made his fortune overseas; he had married the poet Maria Banks Woodley in Antigua, naming his new estate in her honour.

=== Dr James Crichton ===
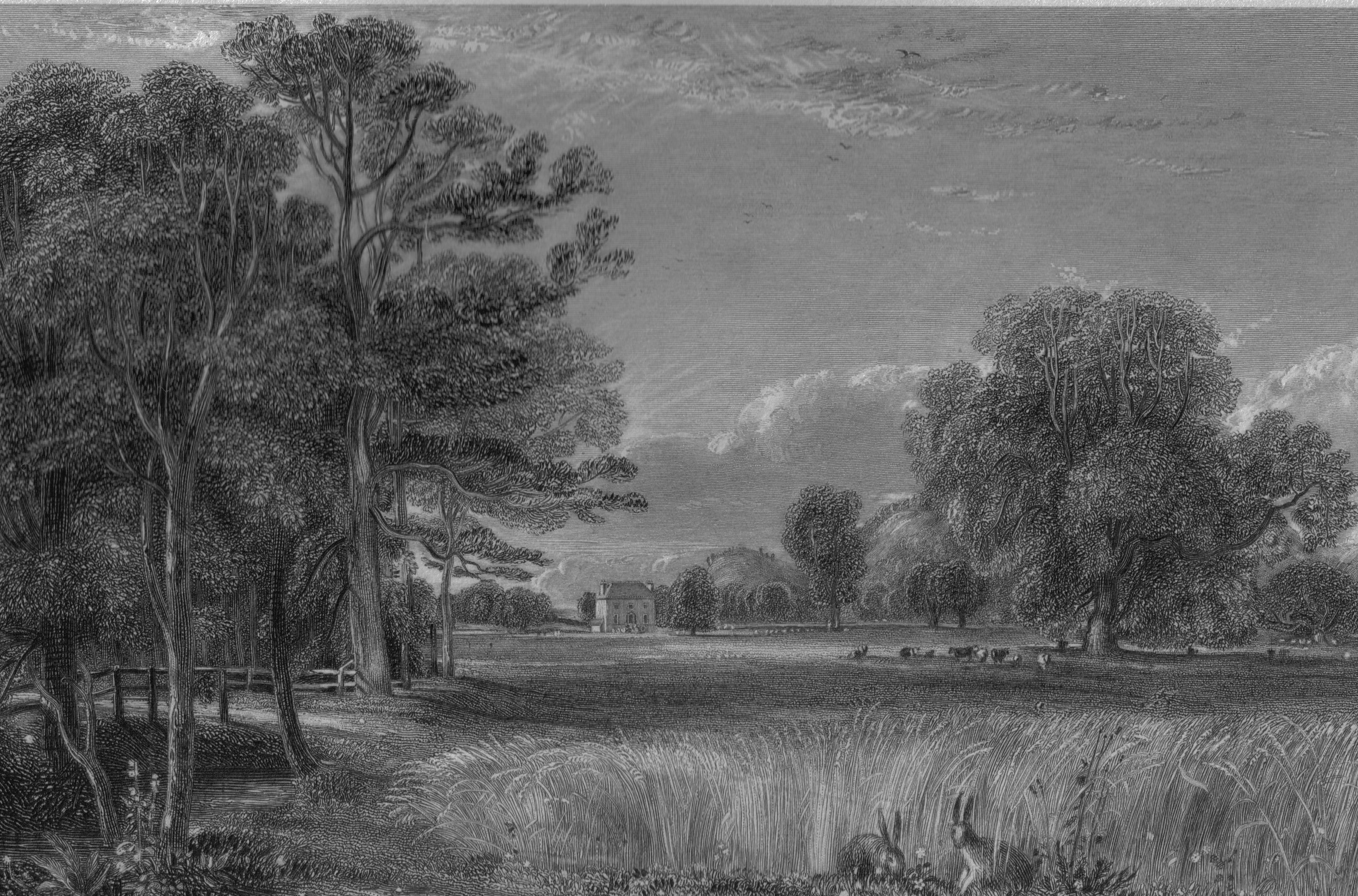
Friar's Carse in the 1840s.

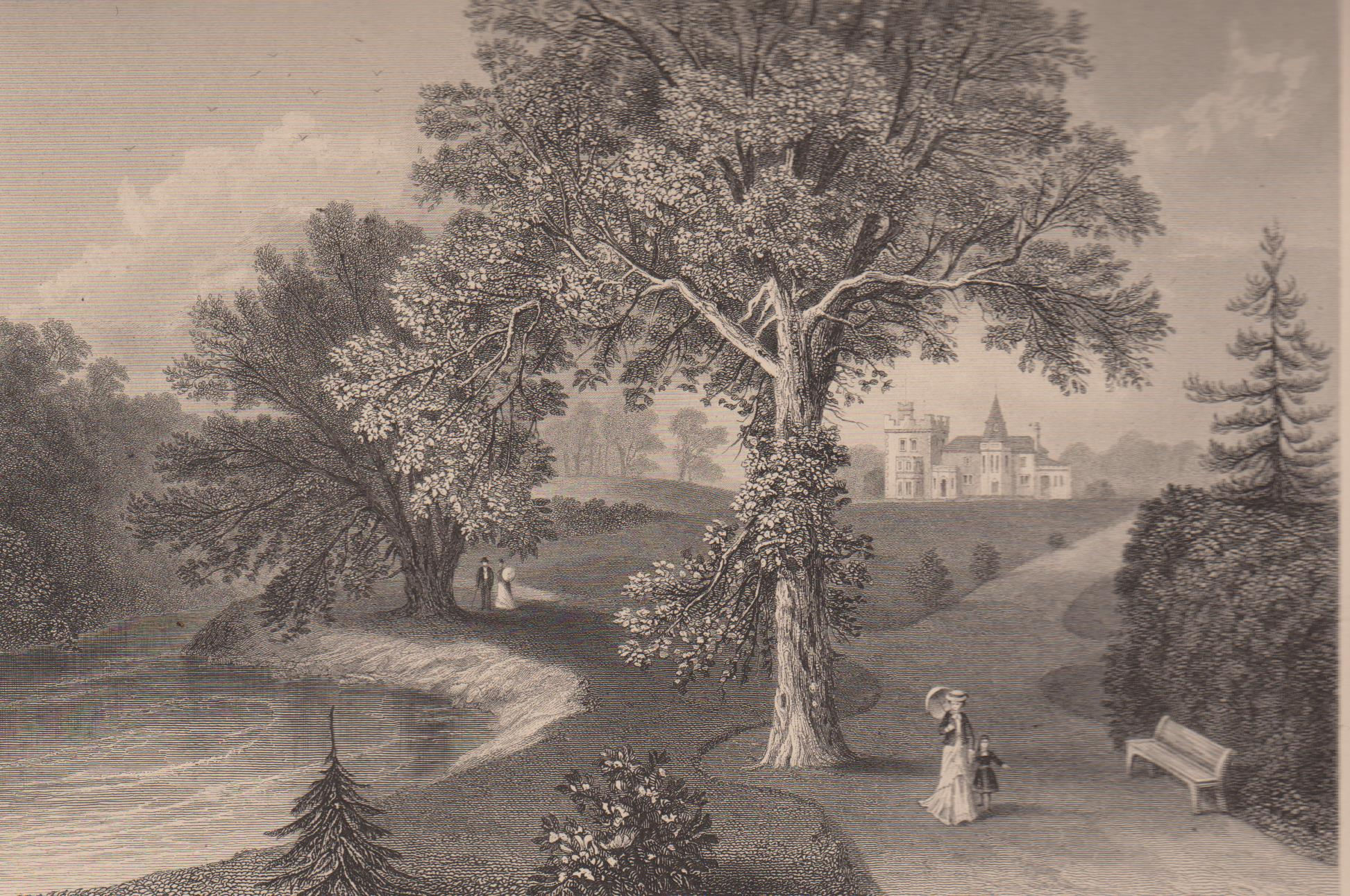
Friar's Carse circa 1800.

A Captain Smith was the purchaser of 'Glenriddell' and he in turn sold the estate on to Provost John Crichton of Sanquhar, brother of John Crichton, who purchased it on his behalf in 1809. The house and estate had therefore been purchased for Dr James Crichton (1765–1823), who had made his fortune with the East India Company in the trade with China and had lived at Canton. In 1812 he took up occupancy and changed the name of the property from Glenriddell back to Friars' Carse and died here in 1823. His widow (Elizabeth Grierson) remained at Friars' Carse until her own death in 1862. The Crichton Royal Hospital in Dumfries was founded by her with a bequest of £100,000 in her husband's memory, or in other accounts founded by Dr Crichton himself.

=== The Nelsons ===
Elizabeth Grierson of Lag, Dr Crichton's widow, sold the estate to Mr Thomas Nelson of Carlisle, said to have been an engineer working on the construction of the Forth Rail Bridge. Nelson added to the mansion house considerably, although he preserved the most interesting part of the old building, such as the 'Whistle' room and added masonic emblems to the hermitage building (see below) in recognition of Robert Burns' interest in the craft. The two lead-light windows in the Main Hall show an anchor and chains that may commemorate his link with the Forth Rail Bridge.

=== The Crichton Royal Institution ===
In 1895, the trustees of the Crichton Royal Institution became proprietors of Friars' Carse and 473 acres of estate policies, etc. The mansion became a convalescent home in connection with the treatment of the insane. The residence was used as a summer residence for selected paying patients, mainly aristocrats and even royalty. Non-paying 'paupers' were also accommodated and were used as servants. The directors of the Crichton Royal Institution sold the property in 1908 for £21,150.

=== The Post Office Fellowship of Remembrance ===
After a spell of ownership by Mr Charles Wedderburn Dickson, who extended the mansion still further, his widow sold the estate to Bryn Asaph Ltd., a Post Office staff organisation, and it became a convalescent and holiday guest home as a memorial to the men and women of the Post Office who died in the two world wars. The Post Office Fellowship of Remembrance (POFR Ltd.) still owns the estate today (2012).

=== Ancient history ===
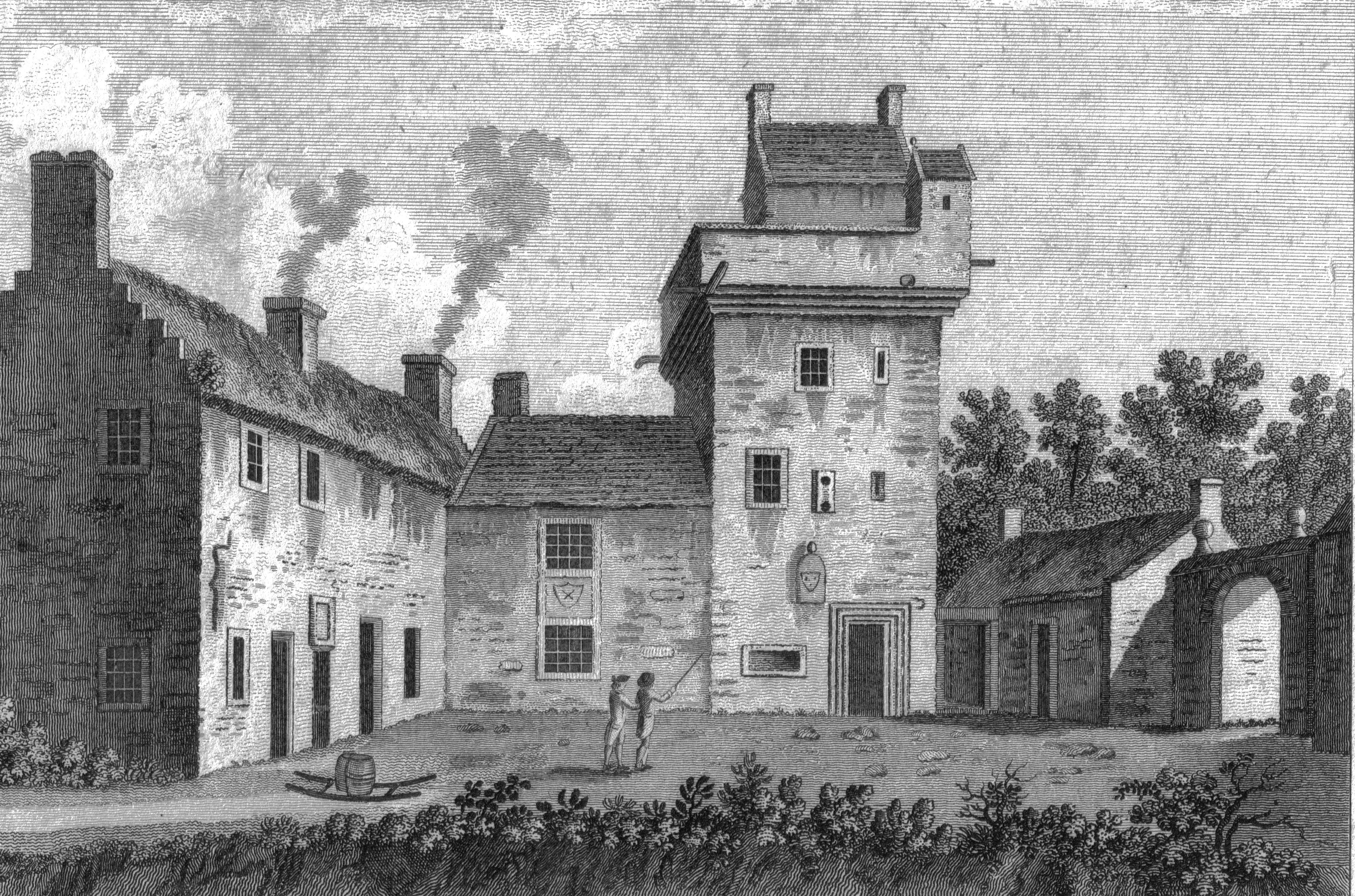
Friars' Carse in 1797. Wilson claims that the representation is a fanciful depiction by Alexander Nasmyth.

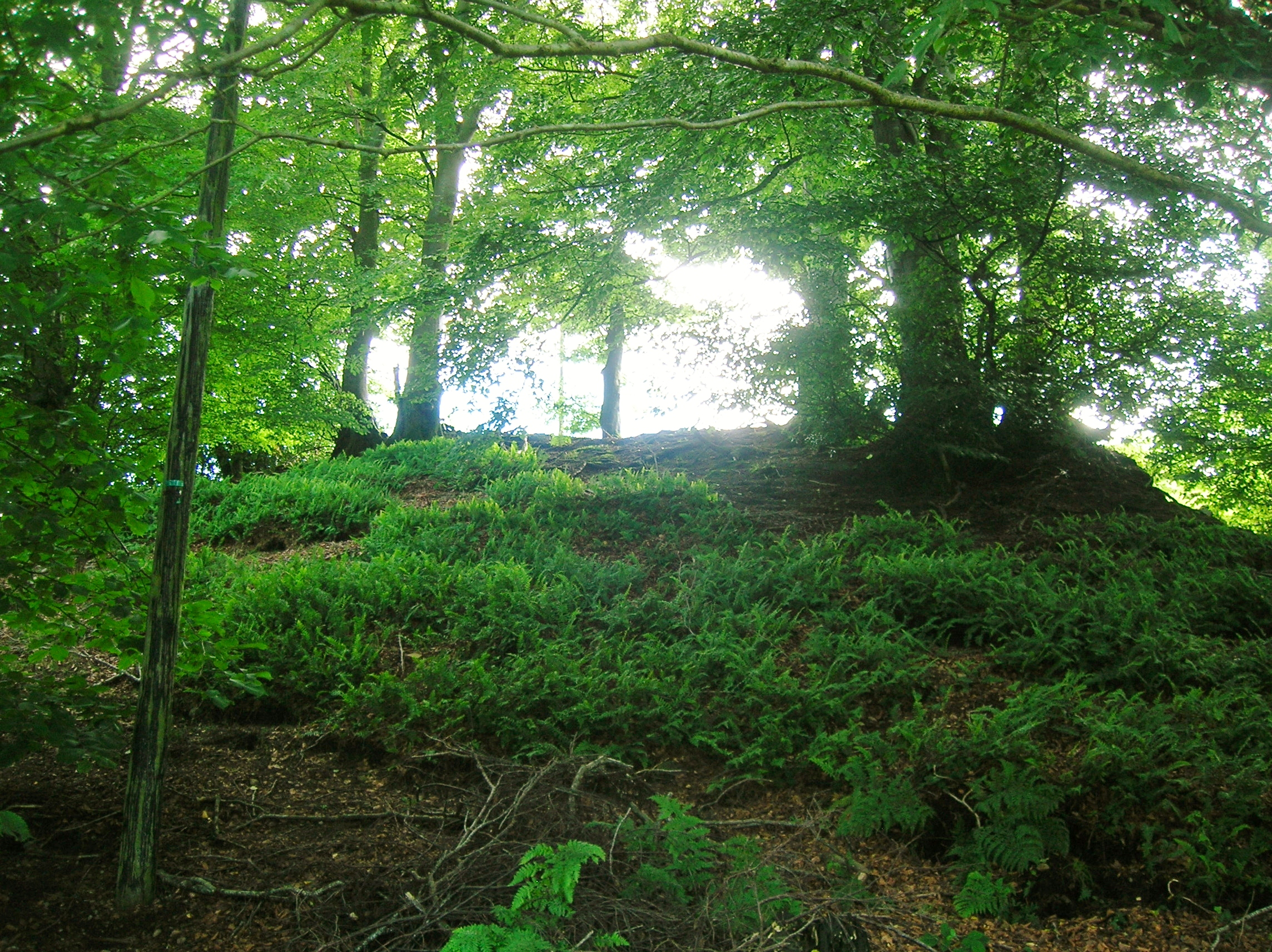
The old Court Hill.

It is recorded that the lands of Carse were given by Affrica, a daughter of Edgar, to Melrose Abbey in around 1215. Edgar was a son of Dunevald and grandson of Dunegal of Stranith. Edgar had possessed the lands under William the Lion. A Monastic grange of the Cistercian monks may have existed nearby as indicated by the name 'Grange Mill'. Abbot Andrew feued out the abbey's lands in 1536, granting the £4 lands of Freirkers and its Grange Mill, together with the restricted multures of the £36 lands of Dalgonar, and other lands to John Kirkpatrick of Ellisland. In 1565 the property was held by Thomas Kirkpatrick and his wife Janet Gordon.

At the reformation the commendator granted the property to the Laird of Elliesland or Allisland (sic), a cadet branch of the Kirkpatricks of Closeburn. The Kirkpatricks built a tower house of 'Freerscarss' here as recorded by Timothy Pont on his map of Nithsdale circa 1595. Francis Grose noted that when demolished in 1773 to make way for the mansion house, the old refectory walls were measured at 8 feet thick and the fireplace 12 feet wide.

Near the house was the loch or Lough (sic), the fish-pond of the friars. In the middle of this loch was an artificial island, a crannog, built from large oak piles and planks; the hiding place of the friar's valuables upon occasions of the not infrequent intrusions by the English into Strathnith. A dugout canoe and other finds were made when the loch was drained.

Friars Carse had been held by the Stirlings for a time in the early 17th century and this line ended with Jean Stirling, an heiress who married John Maxwell of Templand and it was from this line that the Riddells purchased the property in 1737. Prior to 1647 a merchant, John Irving, had acquired Friars Carse and they were eventually passed following arbitration to the Maxwells and finally to the Riddells as stated, with £1500 in compensation paid to the Maxwells.

Friars' Carse passed from the Kirkpatrick's to the Maxwells of Tynwald in 1634, and from them to a cadet branch of the Lords of Maxwell, the Barncleugh family. The Riddells of Glenriddell obtained the estate from the Barncleughs in 1784.

A ninth or tenth century cross stands on a modern base in the grounds (see below) and is the only remaining example surviving from a collection of several stones, put together by Captain Robert Riddell, and once placed along the driveway to the house; one or more may have been at the site originally. Francis Grose recorded that stones from nearby Lag and Morton Castles were in the collection at one time; the Lag stone cut with the letters I. G. and the arms of the Grierson family, namely three cushions, in the centre of a mullet. Robert Riddell went so far as to construct an imitation Bronze Age circle of weathered stones. This bogus stone circle of 38 stones, all standing except three, one of which is in the centre and one just west of the circle; the site was named Templewood.

The lands of Carse once belonged in the 14th century to the Red Comyn and upon his murder eventually passed to King Robert the Bruce.

To the north of Friars' Carse is a site reputed to have been an encampment built by the Roman general Agricola.

Views at Friars' Carse

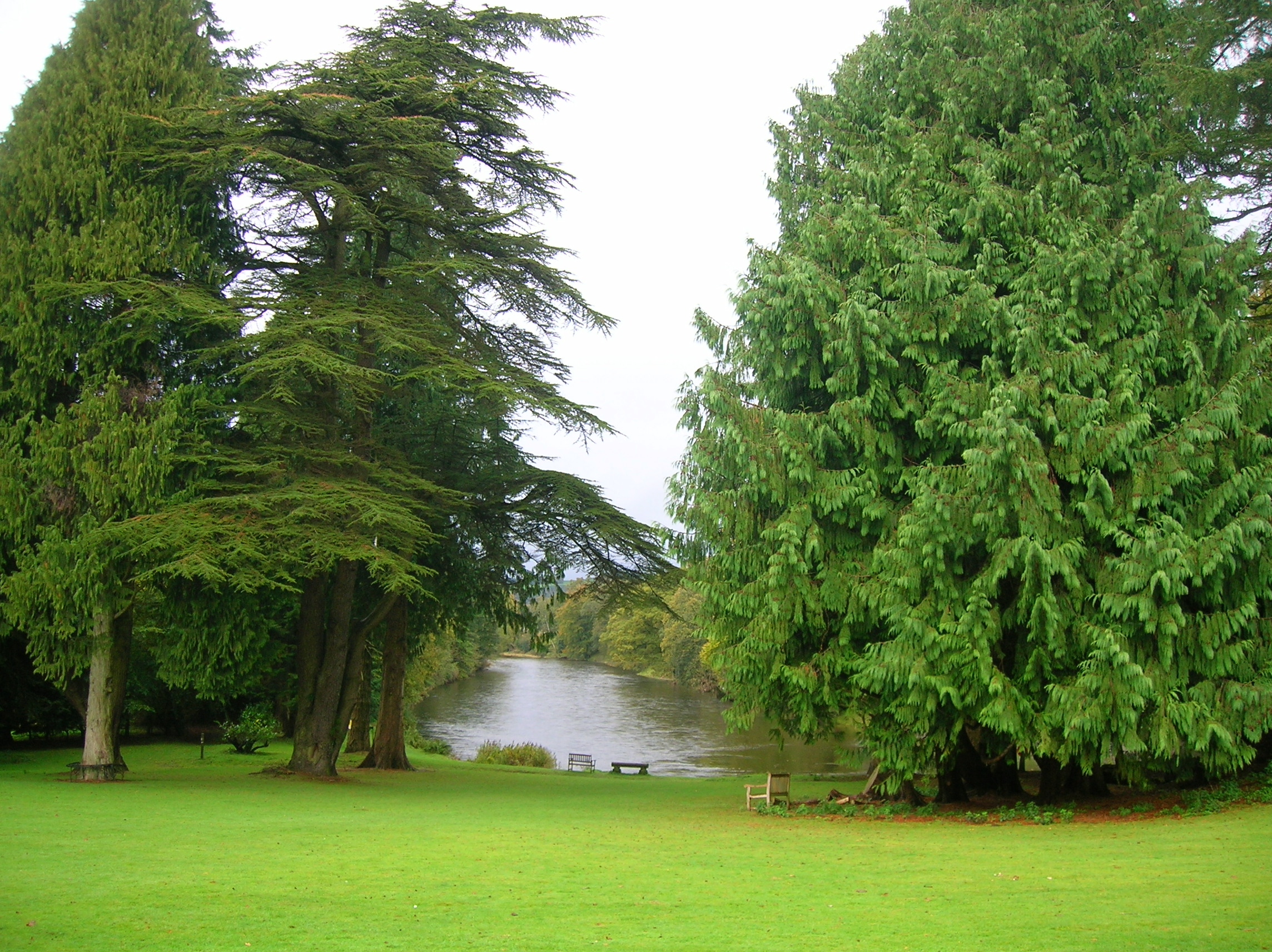
The River Nith from the front door.

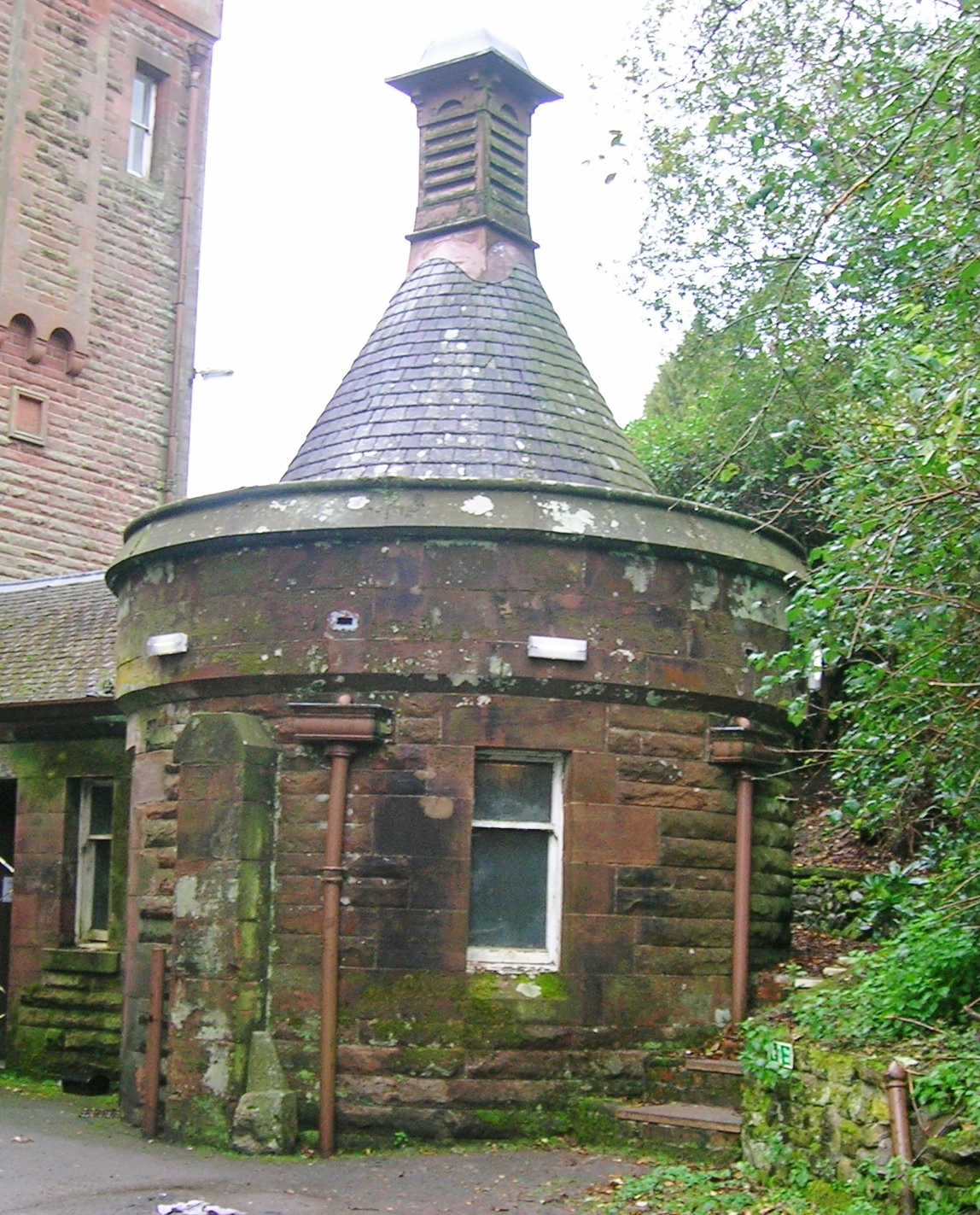
Old Venison or game larder.

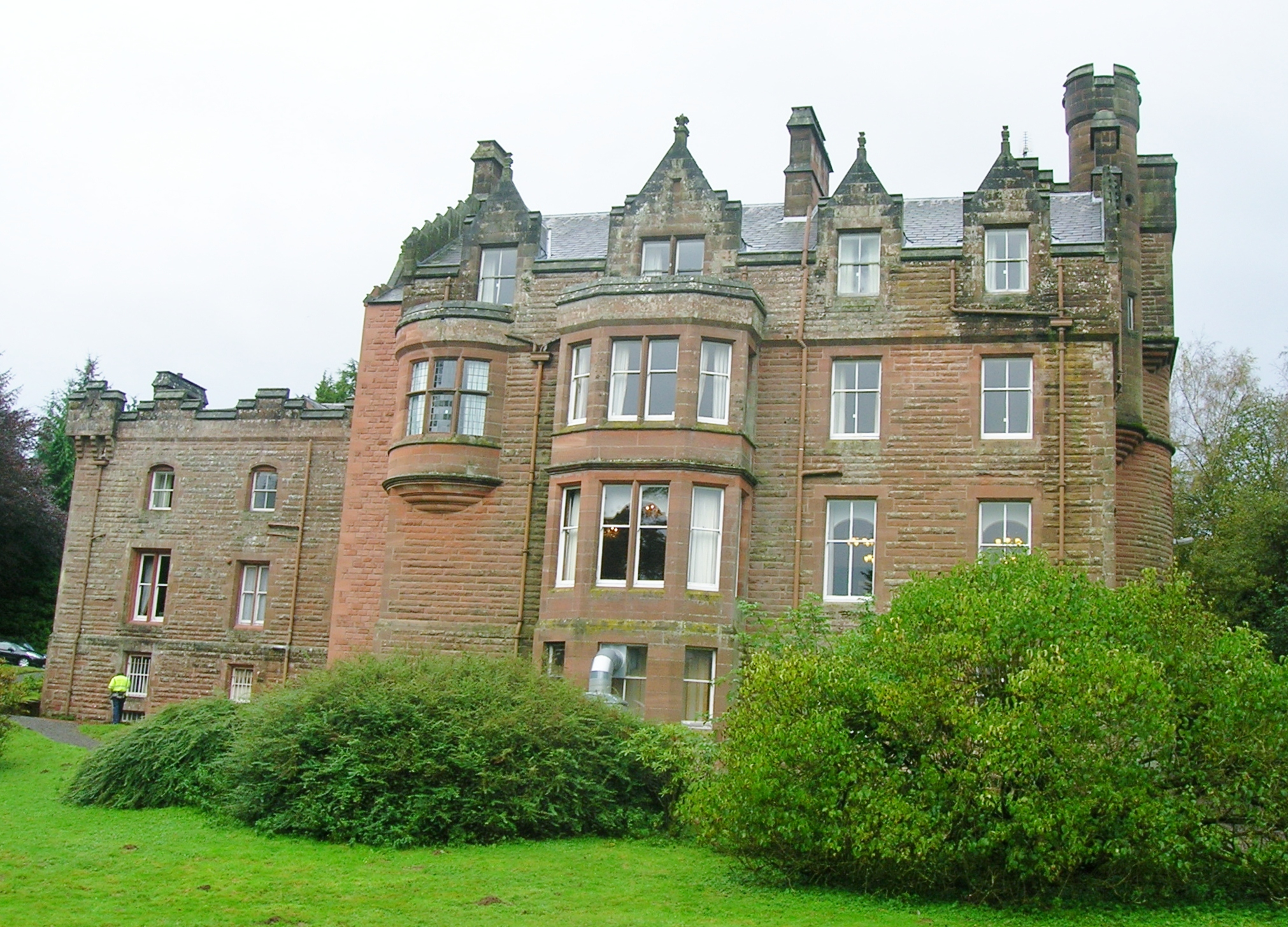
The south facing frontage.

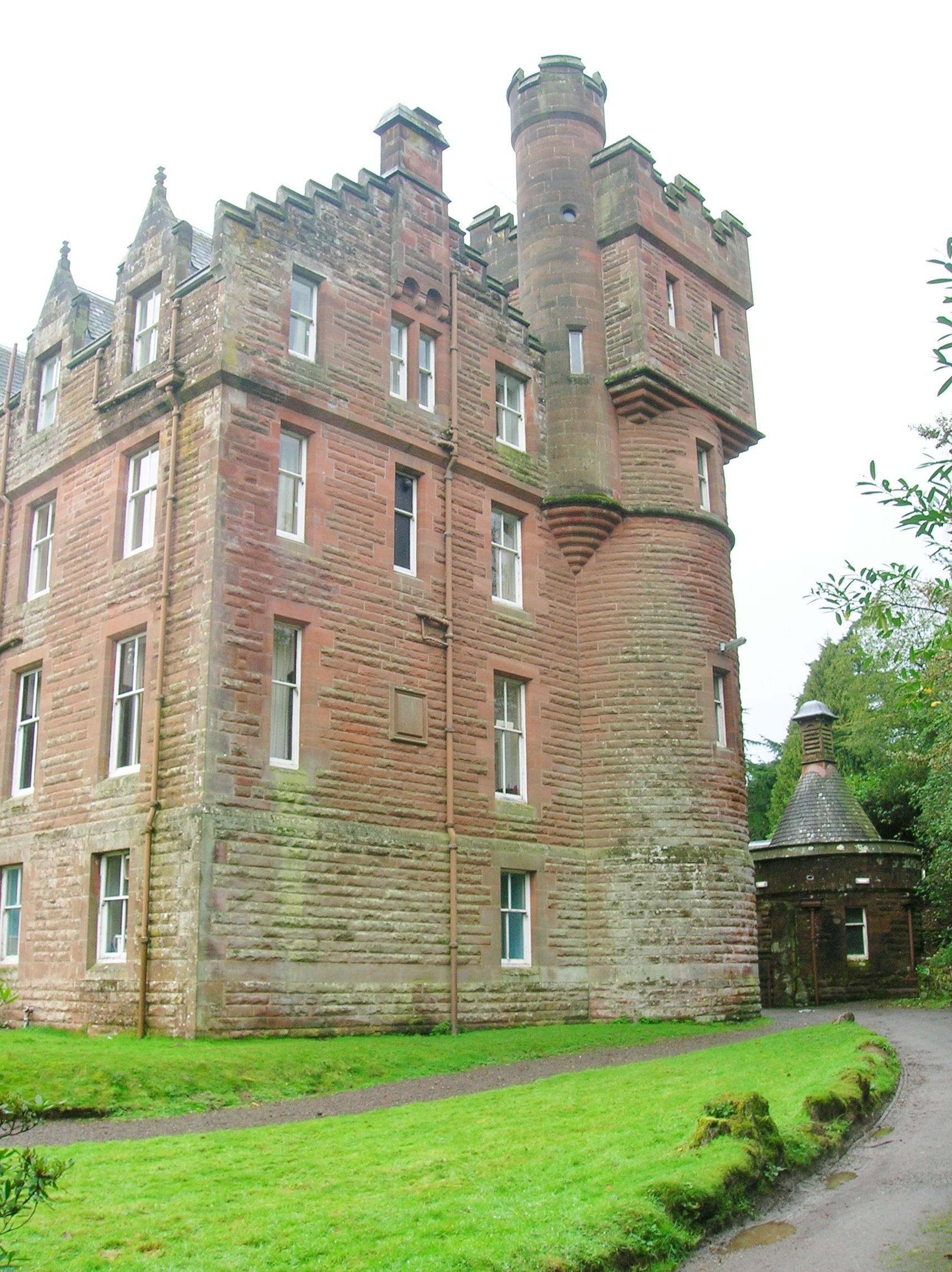
Side tower at the mansion house.

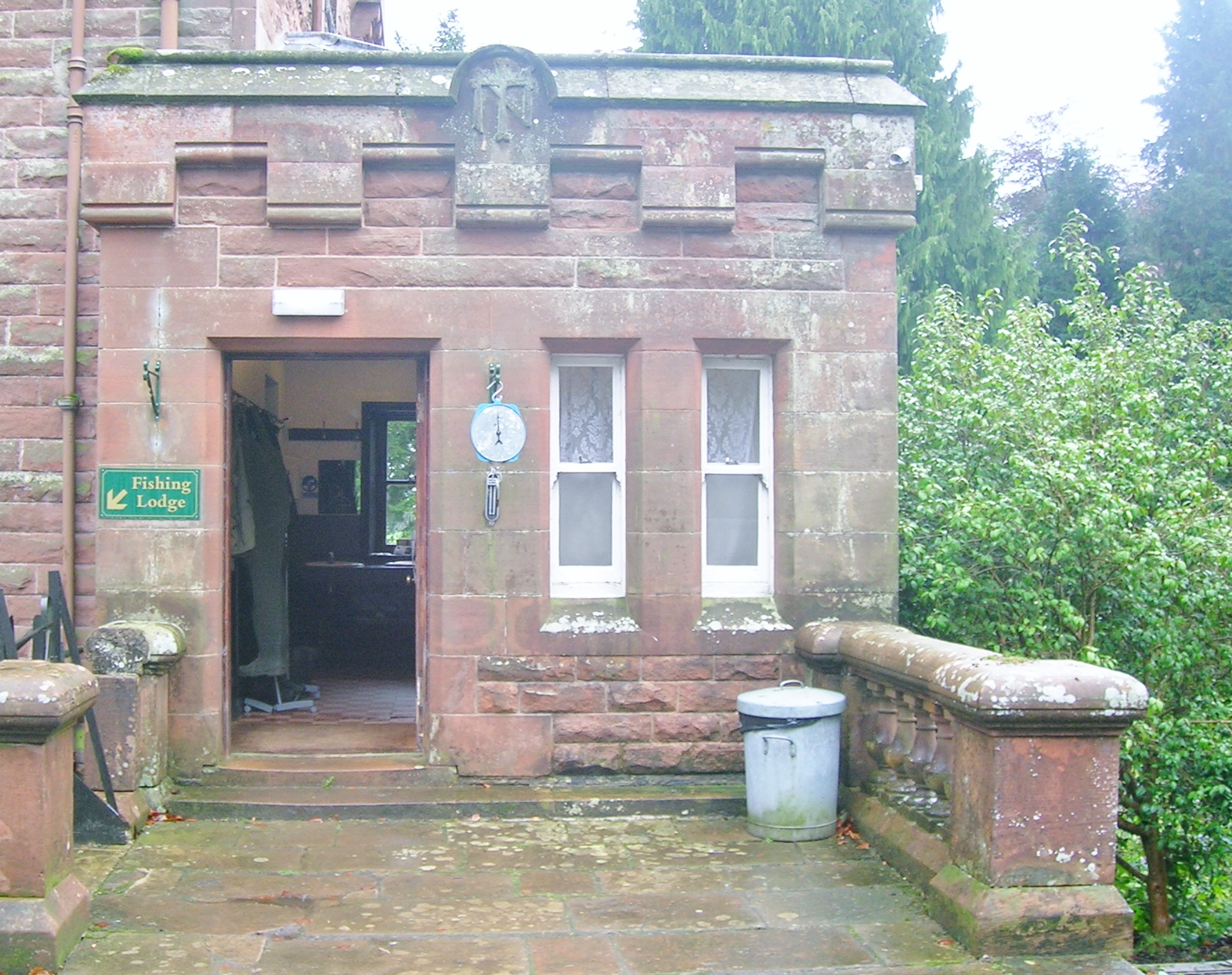
The angler's centre.

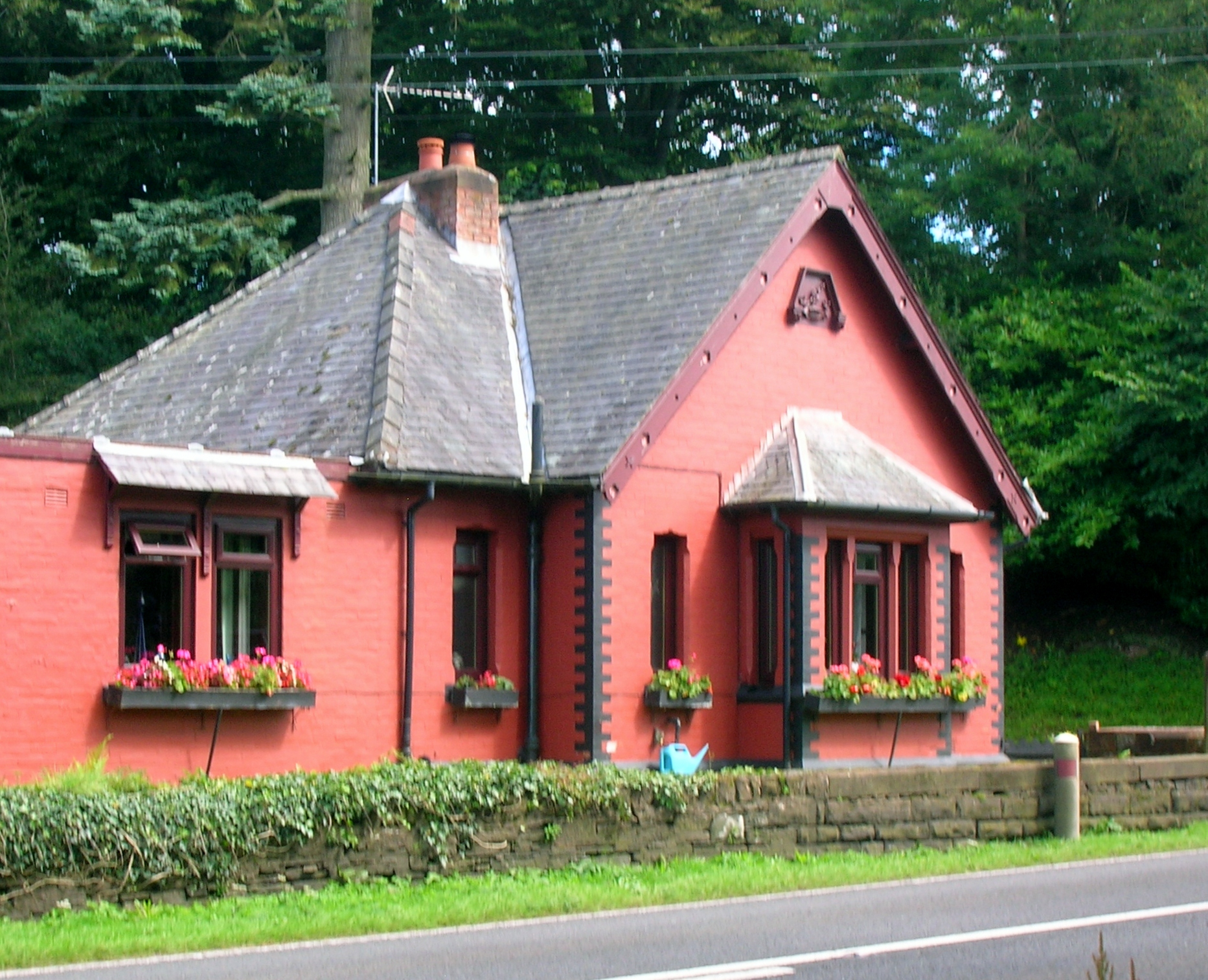
The South Lodge.

=== Cultural history ===
Robert Burns lived at the nearby Ellisland Farm from 1788 to 1791. Burns was probably introduced to Captain Robert Riddell and his wife, Elizabeth Kennedy of Manchester, by Patrick Miller of Dalswinton, his friend and landlord. In September 1788 he composed The Day Returns as a compliment to Riddell and his wife, commenting that At their fire-side I have enjoyed more pleasant evenings than at all the houses of fashionable people in this country put together. Robert had fought in the American War and was an accomplished musical composer and musician as well as an antiquarian.

In April 1791 Burns completed a collection of his poems and songs for Robert Riddell's library and these have become known as the Glenriddell Manuscripts. The one completed volume was later returned to Burns.

Burns visited Wanlockhead in January 1792 to explore the lead mines. He was accompanied by Maria Riddell, Robert Riddell's sister. They breakfasted at Sanquhar and then took a poste-chaise to the mines. They went a considerable distance into the mines, braving the dark, wet and cramped conditions at first, however they had to turn back as Burns found the poor air very distressing. Burns did not record this visit, however Maria included the details in a letter.

Robert Riddell set up the Monkland Friendly Society at Dunscore together with Robert Burns and helped to organise and censor its library of 150 volumes. Riddell was the president and Burns was the secretary of the society that met on every fourth Saturday. Wanlockhead and Leadhills also had libraries at this time, set up and run through the subscriptions of members.

Burns refers to Riddell's coin collecting in the Election Ballad of 1790: –

Glenriddel, skill'd in rusty coins
Blew up each Tory's dark designs,
And bared the treason under.

Robert Riddell discovered a gold ring weighing 1 oz. and set with a pale blue stone near Friars' Carse in May 1791.

In December 1783 Burns's friendship with the Riddells ended following a drunken incident at Friars' Carse known as the Rape of the Sabines; a 'raid' against the ladies which was too realistic and exuberant for good taste. He was ordered off the premises and Elizabeth Riddell never forgave Burns. Robert Riddell died at the age of 39, before any chance of a healing of friendships was possible. Walter and Maria Riddell moved to London upon Robert's death and when she returned, to Tinwald House near Dumfries, she eventually forgave Burns for his indiscretion.

News of this dissolute and dissipated affair seems to have reached the ears of his Excise superiors in Edinburgh and harmed his reputation.

==== Annie Laurie ====
Alexander Fergusson of Craigdarroch married 'Bonnie' Anna Laurie or Annie Laurie in 1710, daughter of Sir Robert Laurie, Bt., of Maxwelton, the Annie Laurie of the song. Although she lived at Craigdarroch for over 50 years, she died at Friars' Carse on 5 April 1764, aged 81. The whereabouts of her grave is unknown, however she may have been buried at Craigdarroch. She was a grand-aunt of Robert Riddell and had been born at Maxwellton House, situated a few miles away near Moniaive.

==== Francis Grose ====
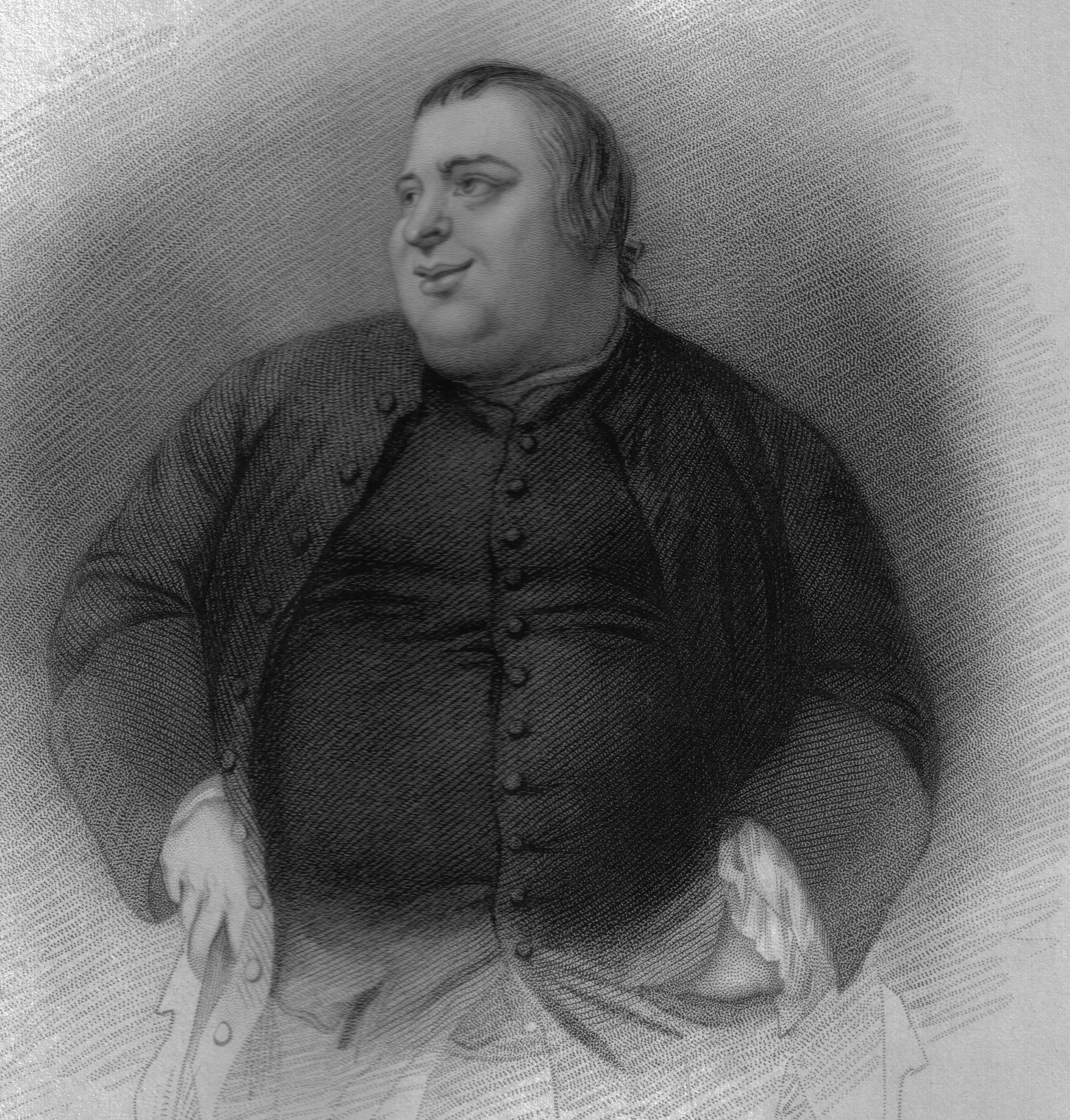
Francis Grose FSA.

The well known antiquary, artist and author, Francis Grose, stayed at Friars' Carse for a few months whilst visiting sites in the area such as Lag Castle for inclusion in his book, The Antiquities of Scotland, published in 1797. Grose struck up a strong friendship with Robert Burns and this artistic collaboration resulted in Burns composing Tam o'Shanter. "Fine, fat, fodgel Grose" was how Burns described his rotund friend.

==== The Whistle and the drinking contests ====
On Friday, 16 October 1789 (1790) at Friars' Carse, Robert Burns was present at a famous drinking contest where three lairds set out to see who could be the last man able to blow an ebony whistle inherited by Robert Riddell. This was a repeat of previous contests in which the winner was to have the old ebony Whistle as the trophy; the event was immortalised in the poem The Whistle.

The winner was able to consume over eight bottles of claret (others say five or six). Alexander Fergusson of Craigdarroch was the winner, being able to still stand and blow the whistle; Sir Robert Laurie of Maxwellton collapsed on the floor; and Robert Riddell retired and went to his bed. The Duke of Buccleuch's chamberlain, McMurdo of Drumlanrig was the judge at the event, with two other neighbours acting as witnesses.

Some references say that the ebony whistle had been brought over from Denmark by a courtier in the service of Queen Anne's husband, Prince George of Denmark. Confusion has arisen as the first drinking contest had been won in a competition by a previous Sir Robert Laurie and the original owner of the whistle, a courtier in the train of Anne of Denmark, wife of King James IV of Scotland; in a second contest his son, Walter, lost the whistle to Walter Riddell, an ancestor of Robert Riddell.

Groome records that the ebony whistle became the centre of drinking contests through the habit of the original Danish owner, a man of 'gigantic stature' who would challenge all comers, the last person able to blow the ebony whistle being the winner. Sir Robert Laurie took on the massive Scandinavian and in a contest that lasted 'three days and three nights' left the courtier beneath the table, and claimed the whistle.

Allan Cunningham relates that The Bard himself, who drank bottle and bottle about, seemed quite disposed to take up the conqueror when the day dawned, however the veracity of this account is strongly disputed by more reliable biographers.

Burns borrowed, with permission, the ebony whistle a few days after the contest to show to friends at Mauchline and he also organised a second drinking contest at Sanquhar's New Inn involving himself, Edward Whigham, John Rigg, John King, and William Johnston. The participants partook of whisky toddy served in a punch-bowl. It is that the victor on this occasion was William Johnstone. The judge was John, son of Edward Whigham. Joseph Train also records this story and adds that the whistle had been partly renewed since it was won from Anne of Denmark's courtier and that it was usually accompanied by a large 'highly mounted Scandinavian drinking horn' – Burns had borrowed both.

== The Laugh Moor Burial Stone ==
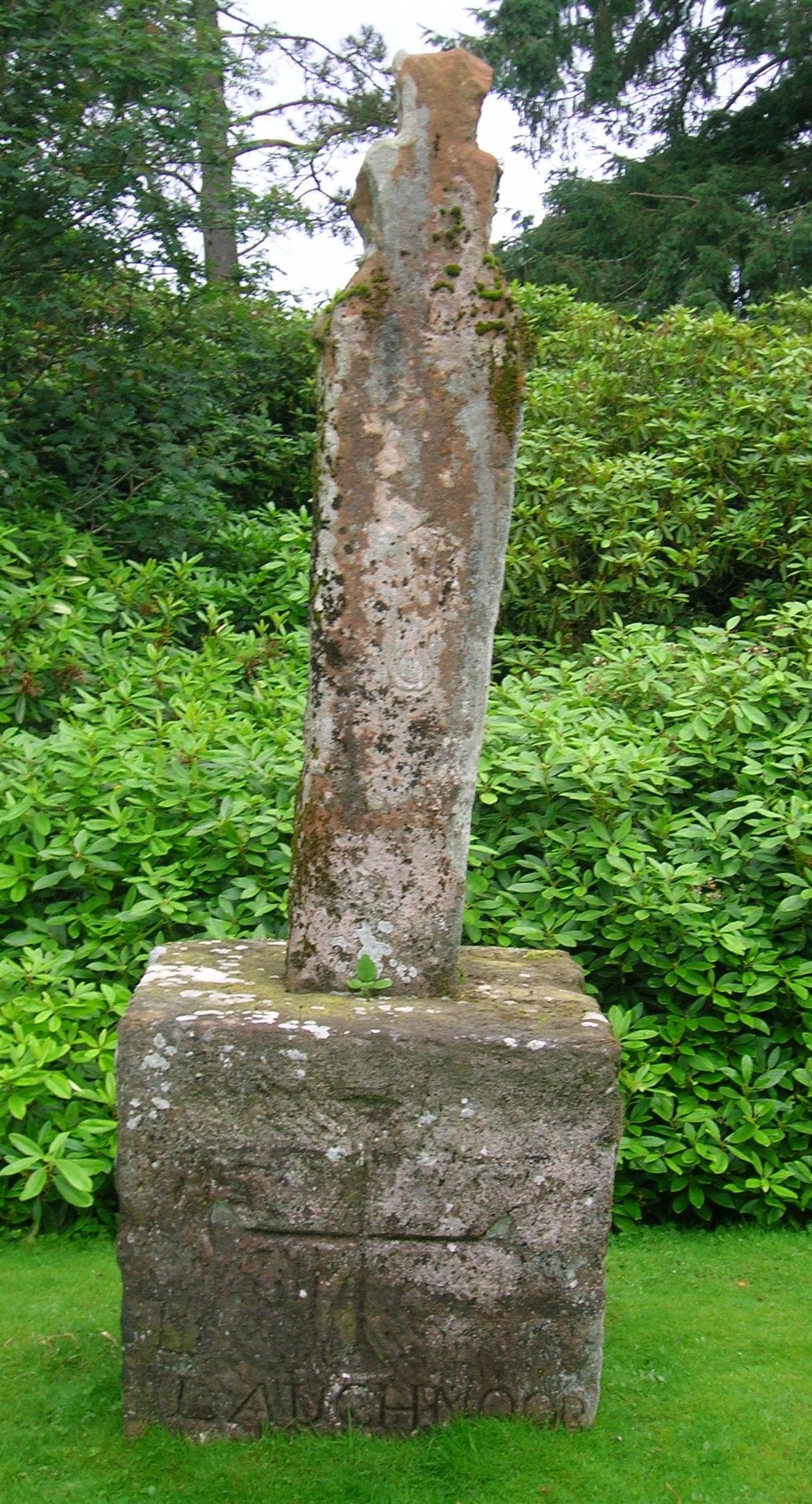
The Laugh Moor Burial Stone.

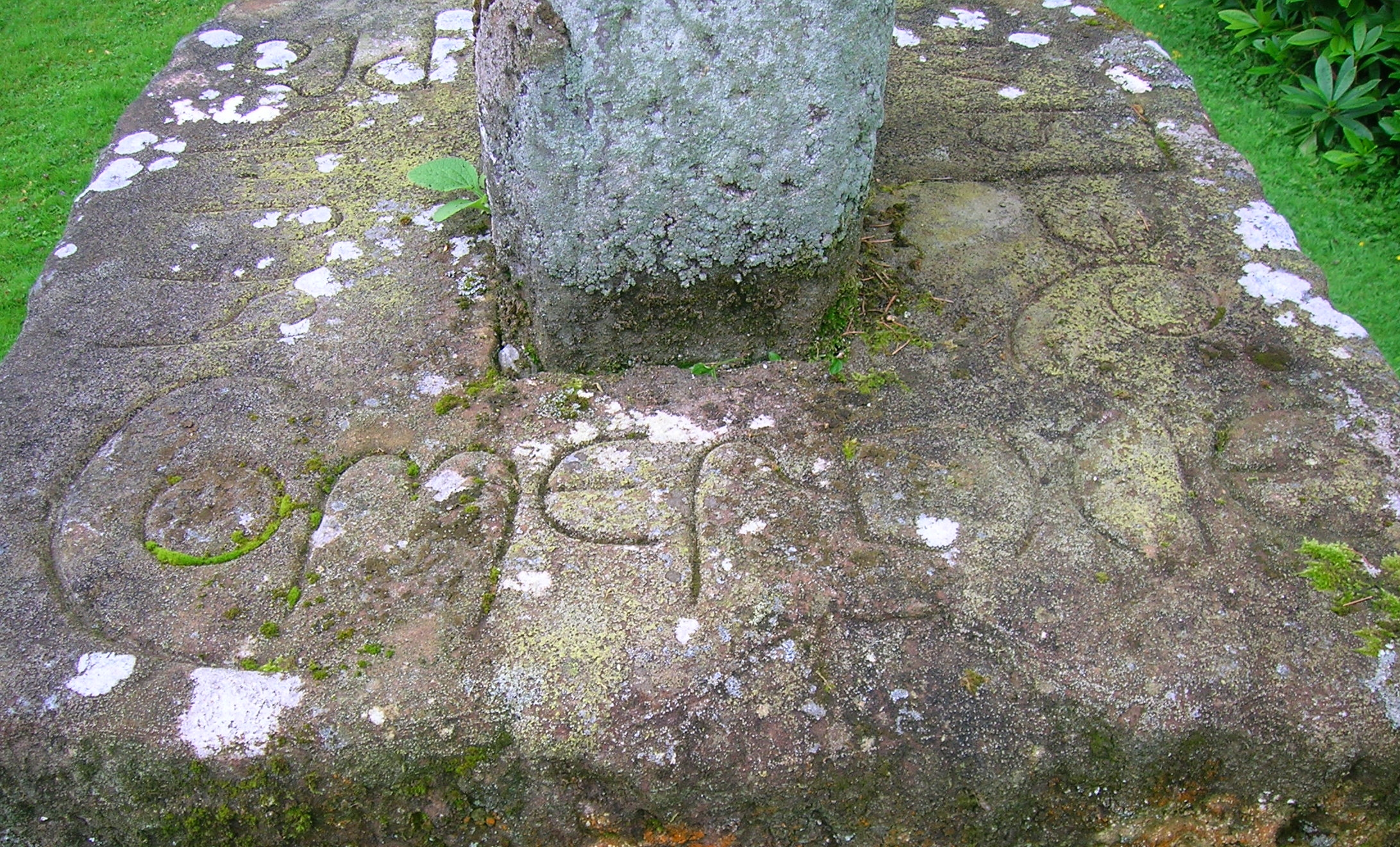
Inscriptions on the cross's new base stone.

Situated on the old putting green is the only remaining cross from Captain Riddell's collection, which also included a 5th-century cross and font, sundials, and later baptismal fonts, all now located at the Dumfries Museum. The Laugh Moor cross is thought to have originally been a village cross, dating from the 9th century and from Castle Morton. It was of a Celtic Cross style, however the ring and arms have been broken off. The cross was re-used as a horizontal gravestone and the pair of shears on one side may indicate that the gender of the person was female.

The square sandstone base is not contemporary with the old cross; it bears a carved cross and the words 'Laugh Moor' on the front face. The top face of this square base stone carries the words "Ora Pro Anima Comerchie De Laugh", translating as "Pray for the soul of De Laugh foully murdered." When Robert Riddell found the cross it was in use as a gate post, as shown by the niche cut into the back of the stone.

== The Hermitage ==
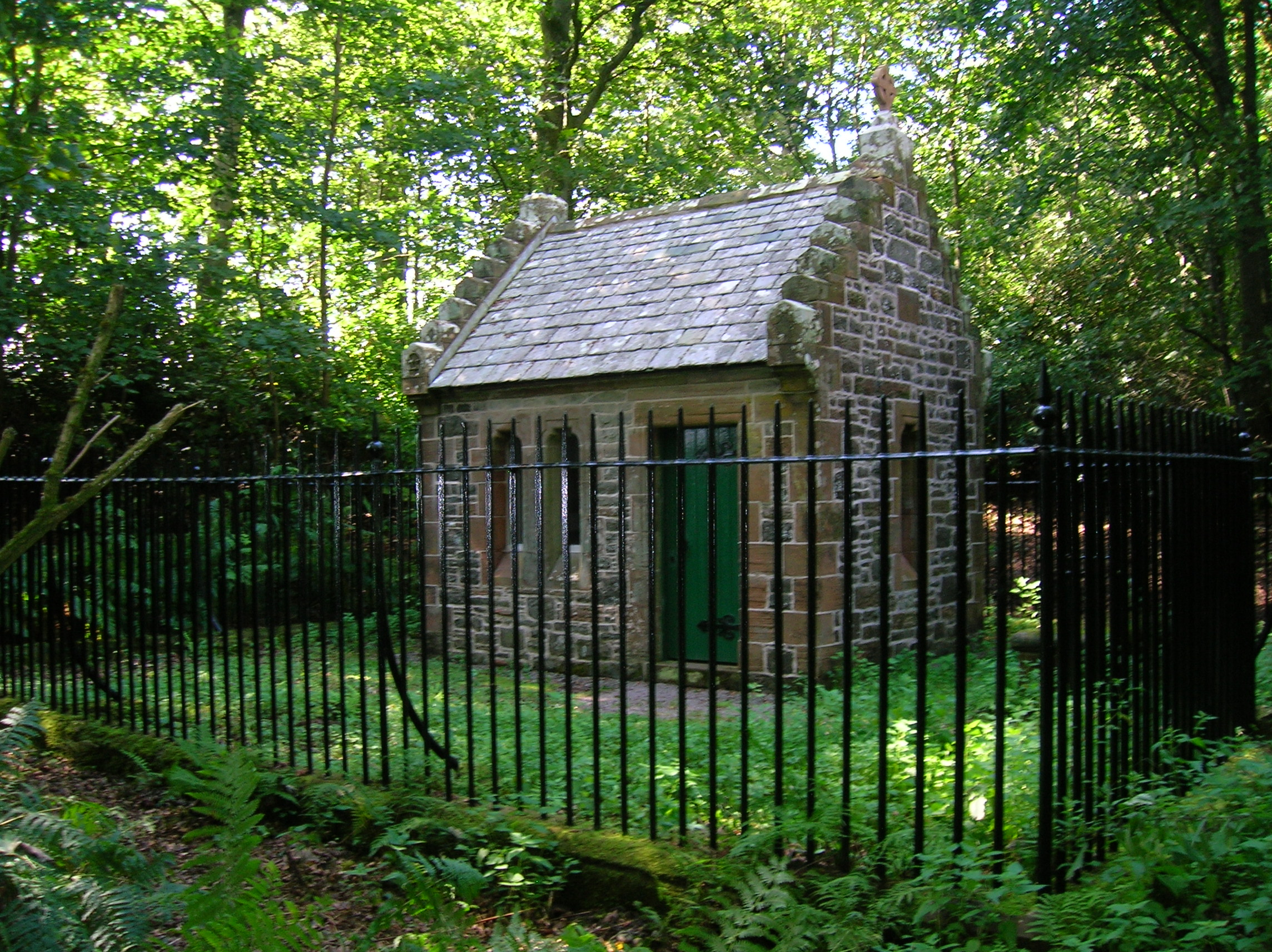
The 'Hermitage' at Friar's Carse

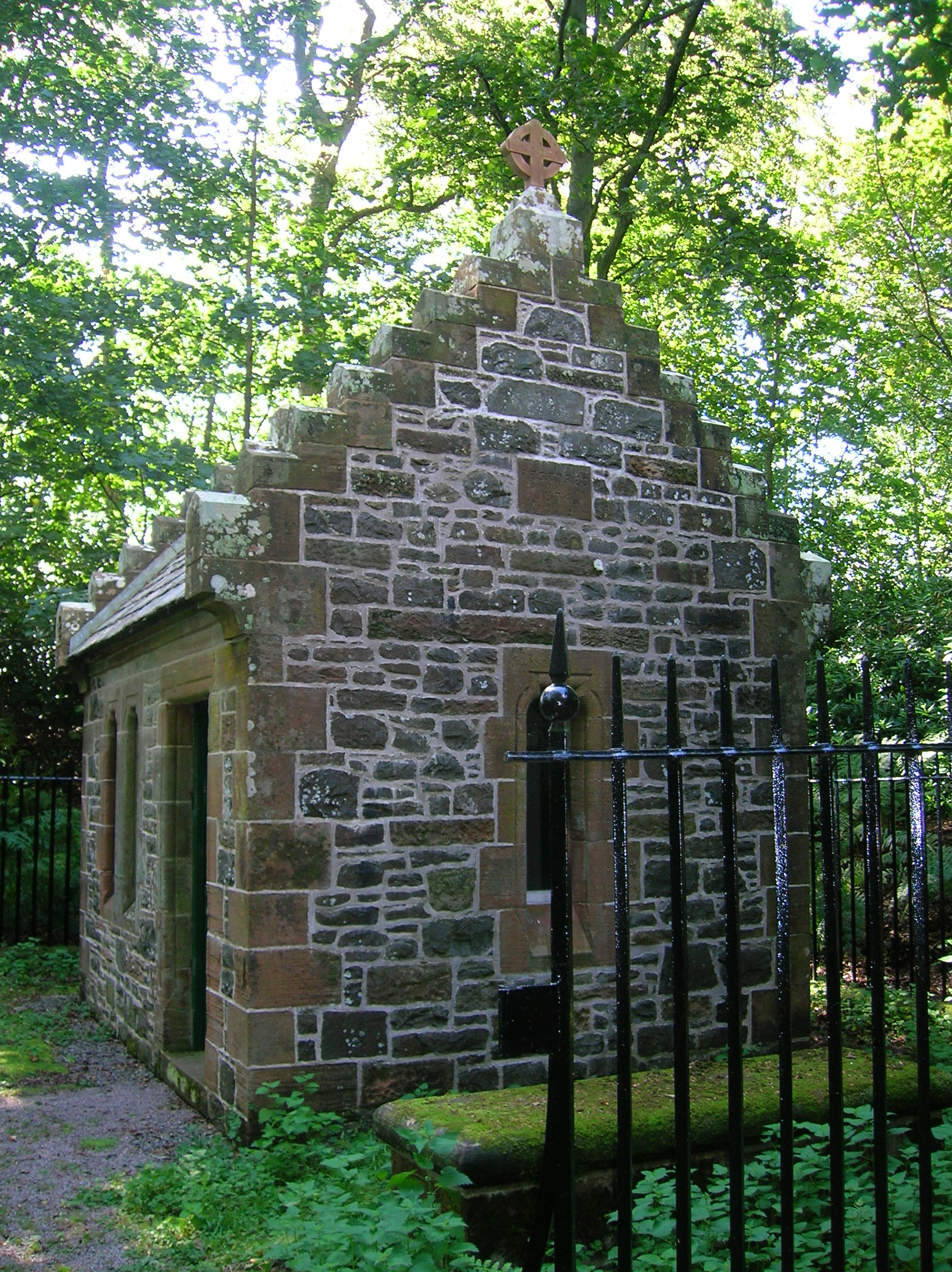
Burns's Hermitage

Captain Robert Riddell of Glenriddel had built a small summer house, an "ivied cot" called the 'Hermitage' in a secluded part of the estate (NX 92589 84519), just a few fields away from Ellisland. Burns often used the building in this idyllic setting for writing poetry, having been given the key to the gate set in the Ellisland march-dyke and apparently also enjoying drinking sessions with Robert Riddell.

On Riddell's death at the age of only 39, the Hermitage was allowed to quietly decay; by 1803 it was being used by stray stock and in 1810 it was reported by Cromek as being derelict and he expressed his shock that the site was not being maintained under Captain Smith's ownership of the estate, for the floor was covered in straw, cattle had broken down the trees and the pane of glass had gone. It measured 10.5 feet by eight and had a single window and fireplace. In around 1870 William Douglas recorded that the only part of the building still standing was part of the east gable. Over the lintel was cut the name 'BURNS' in bold letters.

Although the original building no longer exists, Mr Nelson of Friars' Carse built another 'Hermitage', of a different design, on the same site in 1874. The British Listed Building register sees it as a 're-surfaced' building of circa 1790. Adamson visited it in 1879 and records that it contained the rigid form of a monk, with shaven crown, chipped nose, and folded hands, lying on its back at the entrance. The building otherwise only contained a chair and a small table. The building was recently (2009) restored again and now has an interpretation board detailing its history and a trail guide indicates its location.

Burns had written the lines on the Hermitage window to the memory of Robert Riddell:

Thou whom chance may hither lead,
Be thou clad in russet weed,
Be thou deckt in silken stole,
Grave these counsels on thy soul.

Life is but a day at most,
Sprung from night – in darkness lost;
Hope not sunshine ev'ry hour,
Fear not clouds will always lour.

The original was preserved and is now in the Ellisland Farm museum, having been removed by a new owner of the property and in time coming up for sale at the death of an old lady in 1835 and being purchased for five guineas. The new building's window had the same lines inscribed upon it, however they are now in the mansion house and the Hermitage's windows have no inscription. Friars' Carse at one time held the original Burns manuscripts The Whistle and Lines Written in the Hermitage.

The second window of the 1874 building had the following verse inscribed upon it.

To Riddel, much lamented man,
This ivied cot was dear;
Reader, dost value matchless worth?
This ivied cot revere.

A watercolour of the original Hermitage shows it situated close to the River Nith and therefore some distance from the present day building.

== The River Nith ==
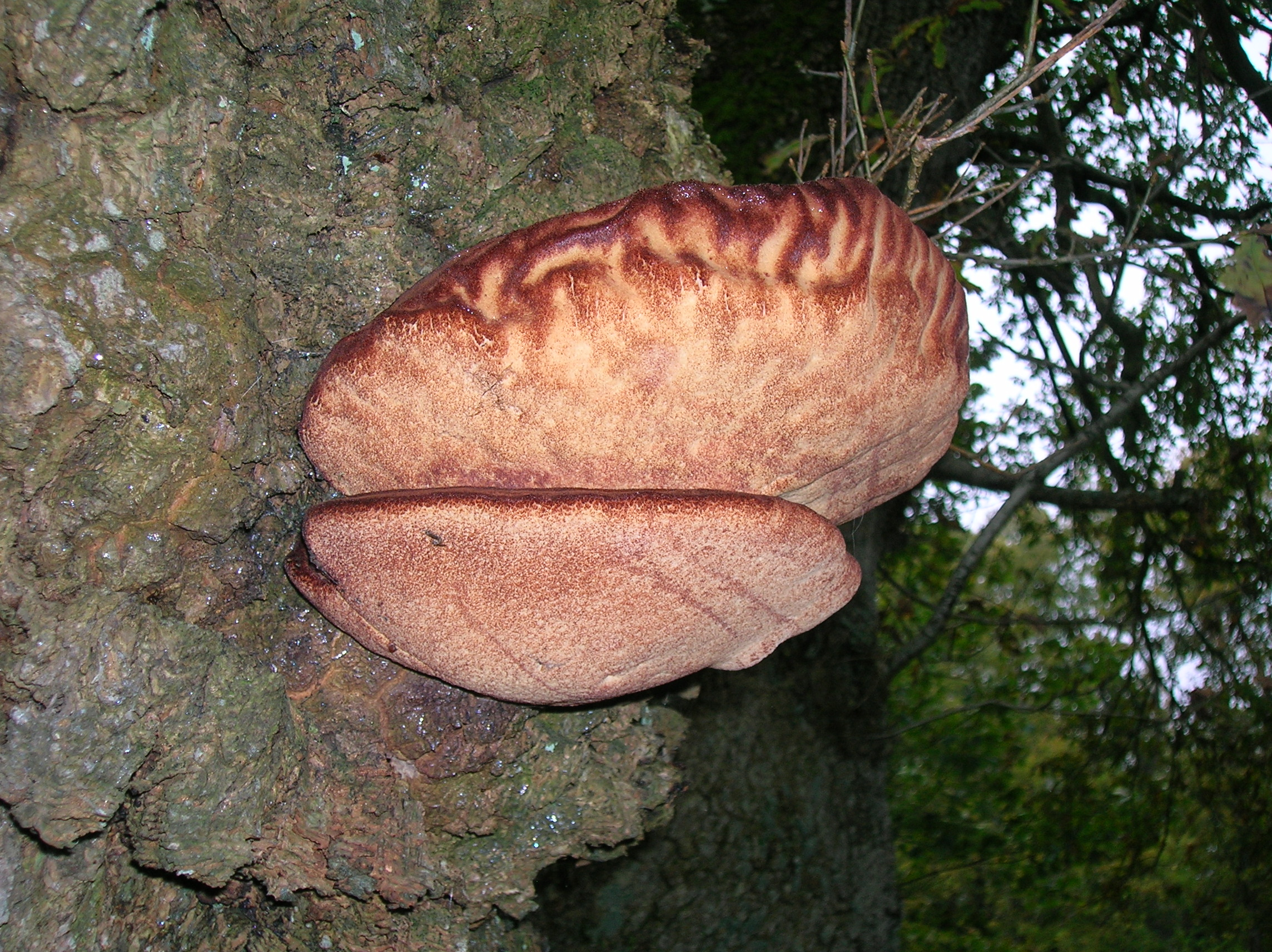
Beefsteak bracket fungus on an oak at the Carse.

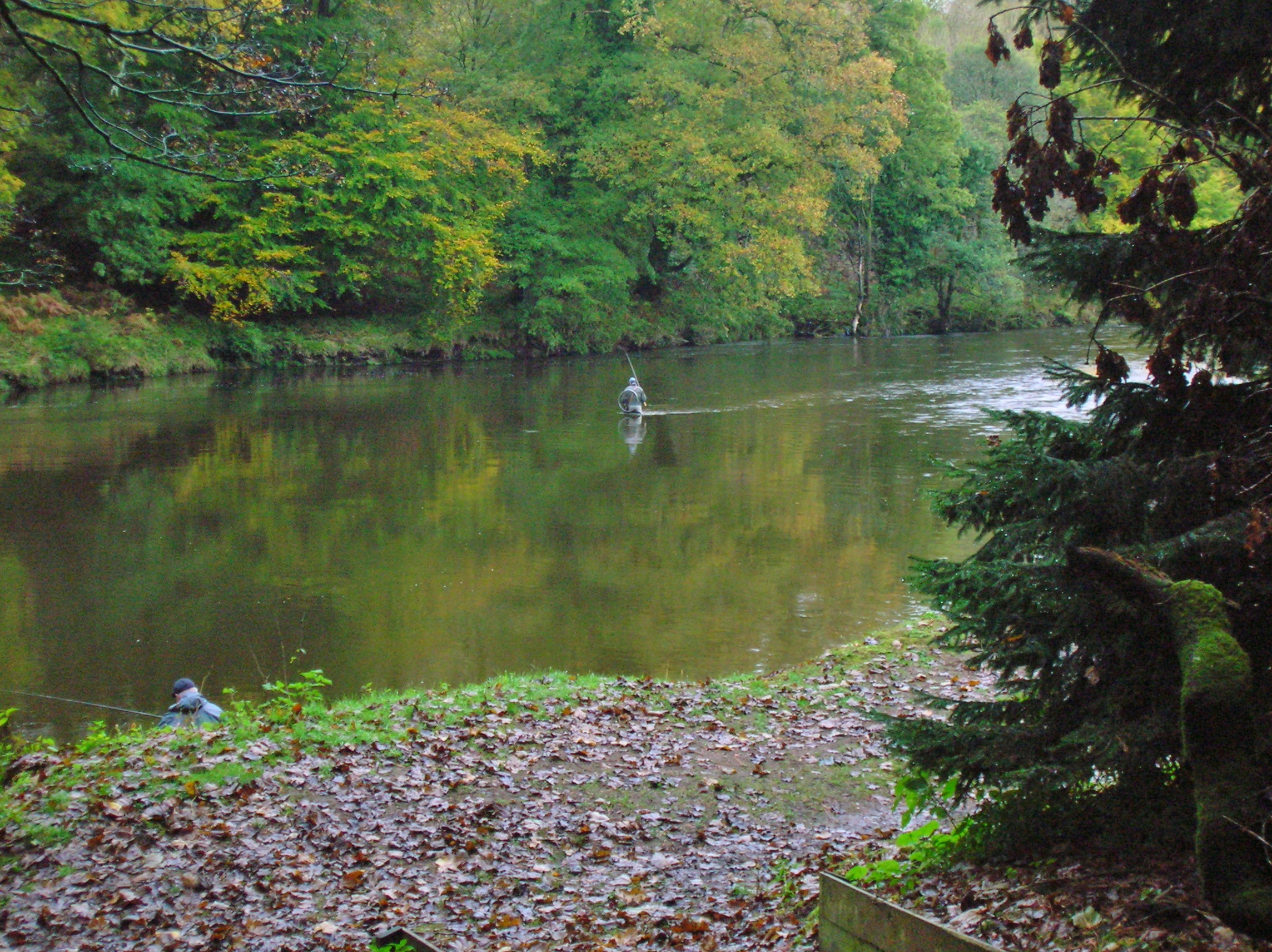
Salmon fishing on the Nith at Friar's Carse.

The course of the River Nith runs close to the Friars Carse mansion house and the fishing beat here consists of 2300 metres of right bank fishing with a mixture of pools providing fishing with fly, spinning or worming for salmon, sea trout and greyling.

The riverbank is lined with woodlands and a particular feature are the ancient and large oaks, mostly pedunculate oak (Quercus robur) and associated fungi of ancient oaks, such as the beefsteak fungus (Fistulina hepatica). Some notable old sycamores or Celtic maples (Acer pseudoplatanus) are also present.

== Friars Carse Country House Hotel ==
The old mansion house has operated as a country house hotel since 1938, set in 45 acres of woodland and pastures. Two estate cottages at the old stable block have been converted for use by visitors. It has the only beat on the River Nith which offers fishing and accommodation.

== Micro-history ==
An old summer house is marked on the 1855 Os map, together with the suggested site of a monastery being at the putting green area. An Oak Knowe is marked near the stables. A Deadman's Hole is recorded on the other side of the River Nith from the mansion house. Black Pool is recorded on the river, upstream of the hotel. Brandyburn Farm is located on the other bank of the Nith, the name often being associated with smuggling and the hiding of illicit spirits. A statue and seat are shown at the start of the path to the Hermitage. A small lochan is shown at Penflowing Bridge near Carse Mains.

A mill was located on the Mains Burn at Carse Mains as shown on the 1855 OS map.

== See also ==
- Glenriddell Manuscripts – written for Robert Riddell of Glenriddell by Robert Burns.
