= Auldgirth =

Coordinates: 55.15°N 03.71°W

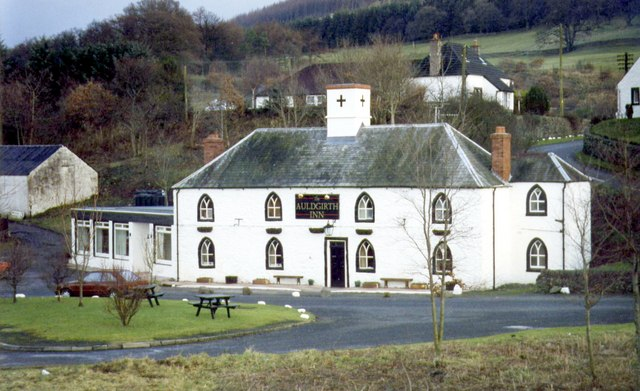
- The Auldgirth Inn, an old coaching Inn on the A76 road.

- Location within Dumfries and Galloway
- OS grid reference: NX9186
- Council area: Dumfries and Galloway
- Country: Scotland
- Sovereign state: United Kingdom
- Post town: Dumfries
- Dialling code: 01387
- Police: Scotland
- Fire: Scottish
- Ambulance: Scottish

Auldgirth is a village on the A76 road in Dumfries and Galloway, Scotland. Auldgirth village features 'The Auldgirth Inn' and the former Auldgirth Primary School, which closed in 2000. Originally inhabitants of Auldgirth located to the scheme, situated next to the A76, but in recent years this has expanded to the outlying areas due to rejuvenation programmes. The name Auldgirth is from Early Scots ald(e) girth, meaning 'old enclosure'. At one time it had a staffed railway station, situated one mile south of the village, just before the hamlet of Dalswinton. Carse Loch and the Friar's Carse country house hotel are located nearby.

A link of Auldgirth to Thomas Carlyle is revealed in the book Obiter Dicta, by Augustine Birrell, Carlyle he wrote, "beheld with pride and no ignoble envy the bridge at Auldgarth his mason-father had helped to build half a century before, and then exclaimed, 'A noble craft, that of a mason; a good building will last longer than most books—than one book in a million',

== See also ==
- Dalgarnock Village, Church and Parish
- Barburgh Mill, Closeburn
