= Carse Loch =

Coordinates: 55°08′40.8″N 3°41′50.6″W

- Carse Loch, Dumfries and Galloway
- Location: Auldgirth, Dumfries and Galloway, Scotland
- Type: Freshwater loch
- Primary inflows: Laggan Burn (previously), Allanton Burn, Rainfall and runoff
- Primary outflows: Mains Burn
- Basin countries: Scotland
- Max. length: circa 150 m (490 ft)
- Max. width: circa 90 m (300 ft)
- Islands: One crannog
- Settlements: Auldgirth

Carse Loch is situated (NX 926 849) in a low-lying area, surrounded by woodland, close to the A76 at Friar's Carse, in Dumfries and Galloway, Parish of Dunscore. It was once used as a monastic fish pond and the friars are said to have hidden their treasures on the crannog in times of danger. The loch is located about 7 miles from Dumfries and 2 miles from Auldgirth.

== History ==
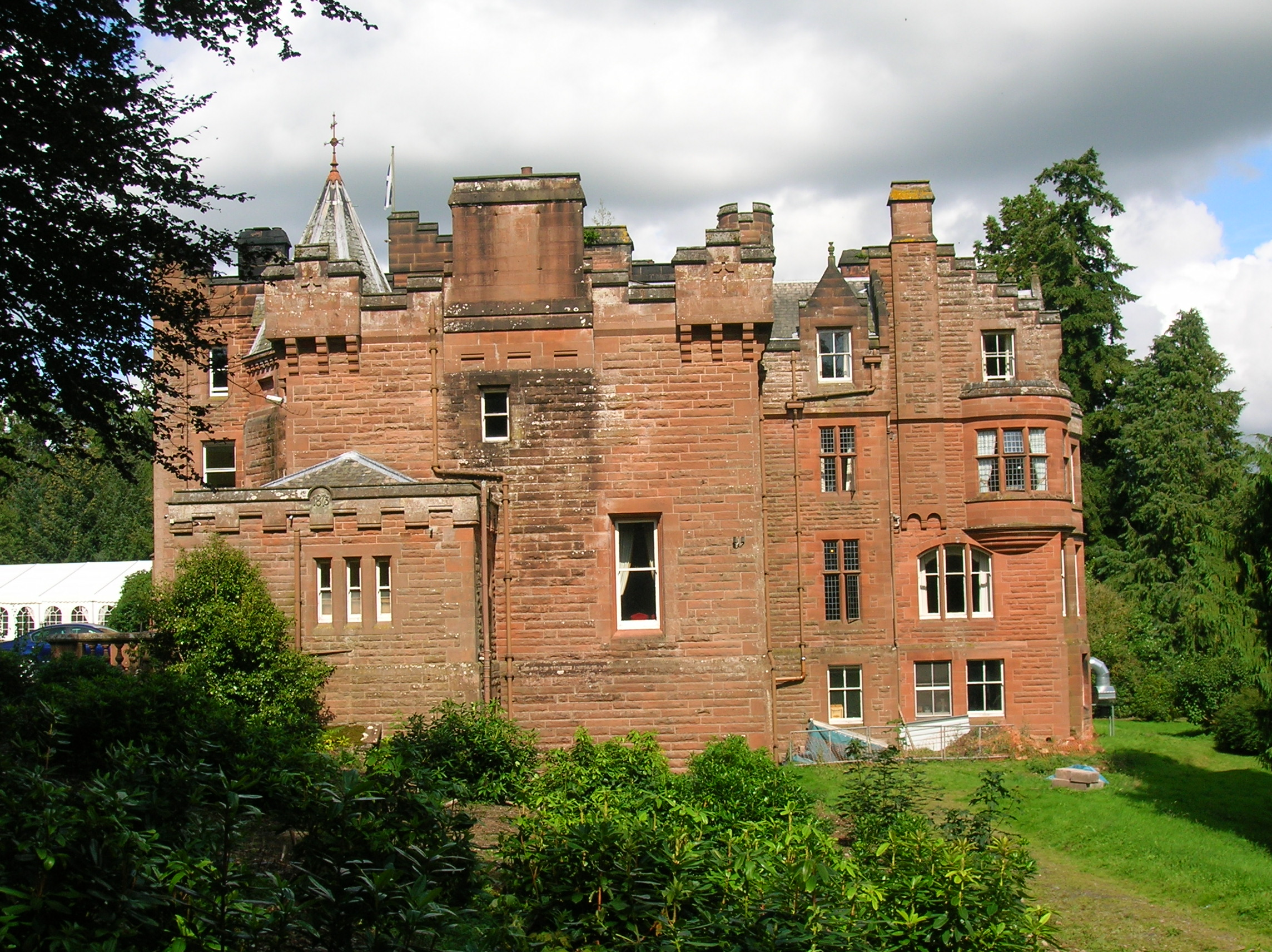
The Friars' Carse mansion house.

In 1465 a charter was granted by Cardinal Antonius of Rome for the Cistercian order of monks from Melrose to build a monastery on the site of the old British fort and druidical circle at Friar's Carse. Only a monastic farm or grange may have actually been established at the site of the present day hotel of Friars Carse rather than a friary as also witnessed by the names Grange Mill, Grange Loch, Grangeview, etc.

The place name 'Court Hill' close to the loch may recall the location of the Court Hill of the friars and later feudal lairds, suggesting that the loch may have served as the drowning pit for female criminals as part of the 'pit and gallows' powers of feudal law enforcement.

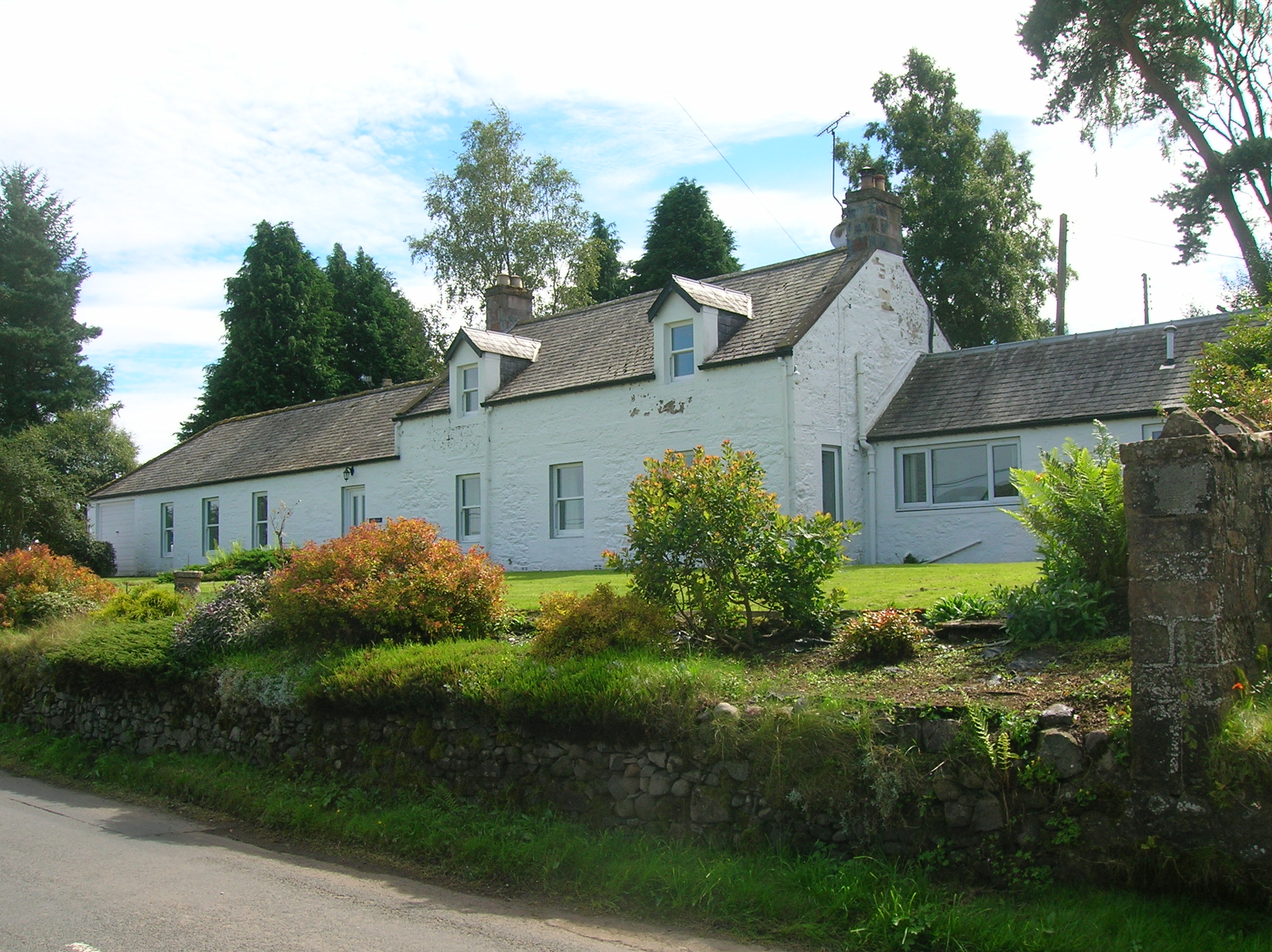
Grangeview House.

The place name 'Kerse or Carse' in the Scots language refers to 'Low and fertile land adjacent to a river or loch'. The loch was once used as a fish pond by the friars of the monastic grange.

William Crawford's map of 1804 shows a Grange Mill and Grange Loch with a single island. Roy's map of 1747 shows a 'Grange Loch' with a mill nearby and a single island.

The 1855 OS map shows a substantial loch with a single island and the nearby Carse Mill corn mill with a lade avoiding the loch and joining its Main Burn outflow. By 1899 Carse Loch has reduced considerably in size and the lade from Carse Mill enters it directly.

In 1909 the loch, recorded as Friars' Carse Loch, had a surface area of between two and three acres. The loch was fed by the diverted and dammed Laggan Burn as well a burn running down from Allanton, the outflow being the Mains Burn. Since the closure of the mill the Laggan Burn no longer runs into the loch, greatly reducing the water supply.

=== The Crannog ===
A small island in a loch near Friars' Carse was identified as a being the remains of a lake dwelling or crannog, and in 1878 was measured as being circa 80 ft by 70 ft. Some of the timbers were morticed and bore traces of clay flooring and central paving. Medieval pottery was found and additionally a dug-out canoe or logboat with a paddle, carrying an inserted sternboard, was found in the mud near the crannog

As stated, the friars are said to have hidden their treasures on the crannog with its pillar or piles during times of war, raids from England, etc. The nearby Debatable lands were also frequently in turmoil.

An axe hammer was found on the old crannog that was located in the loch.

Carse Loch is now much reduced in surface area through drainage and is enclosed within a marsh surrounded by a part of the Stottpark woodlands. The original crannog is said to have collapsed under the water surface in 1879 following its archaeological investigation, although one or two islands are still shown on modern OS maps. The loch has since been progressively drained via the Mains Burn.

=== Carse Mills ===
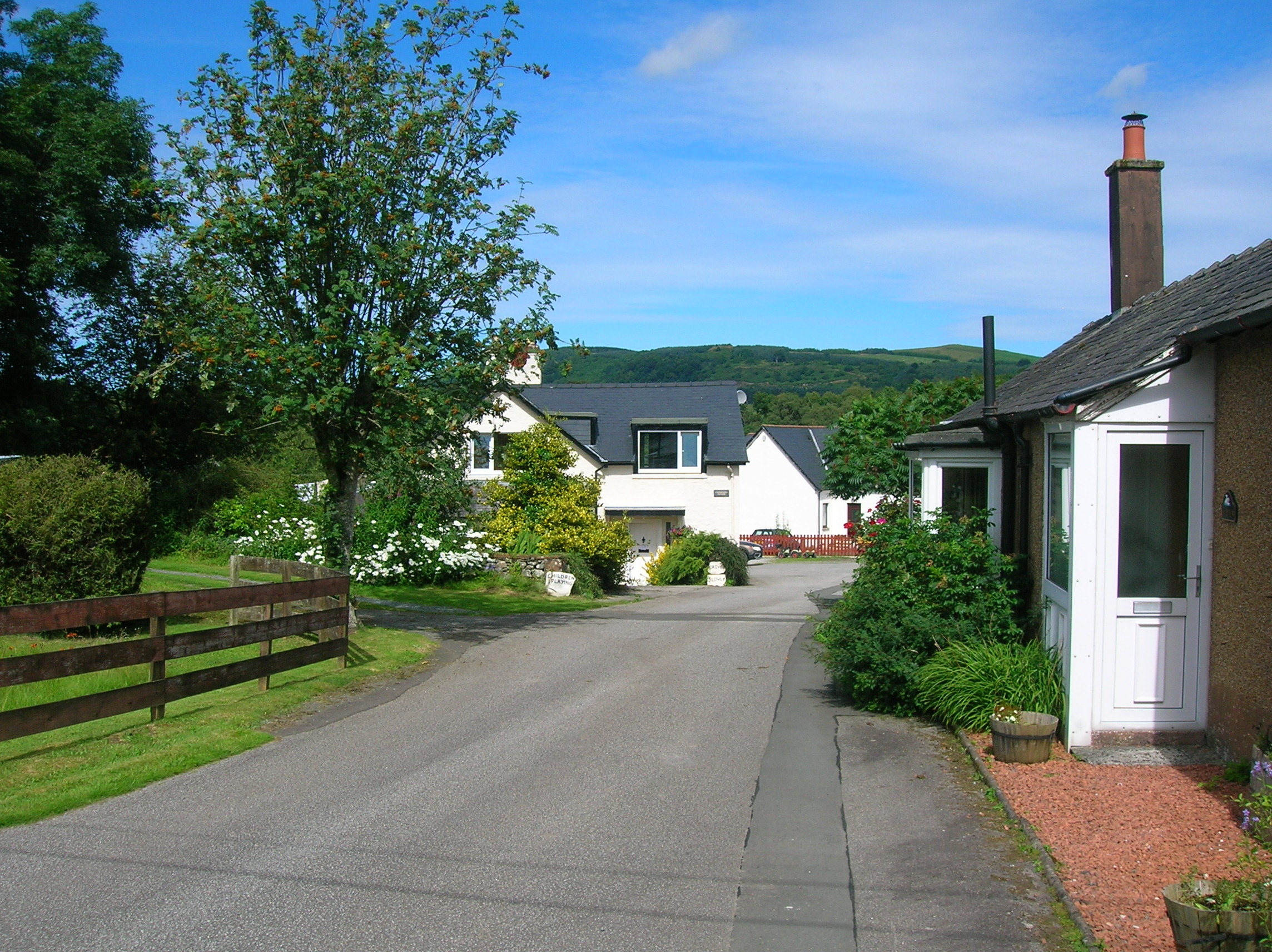
Carsemill in 2012.

The corn mill or miln (Scots), shown near 'Grange Loch' in 1747, was still operational in 1909 fed by the Laggan Burn with two holding ponds with a dam and sluice located to the south of the minor road at Burnhead. The OS maps show that the lade leading away from the mill originally emptied into the Mains Burn until the 1890s when the water entered the partly drained loch directly. The Mains Burn empties directly into the River Nith. A diversion lade is shown on the 19th century OS maps, allowing water to be directed away from the water wheel when required.

A smithy and a small school are marked on the 19th century OS maps next to Grangeview below Burnhead Farm.

A mill building is also shown in 1855 at Carse Mains Farm below Penflowing Bridge, where a small millpond and dam was once located. By 1899 the millpond had been drained and only a hydraulic ram is shown at the site of the old mill.

== Micro-history ==
In 1879 fine examples of Roman paterae or drinking bowls were found near Friars Carse during the construction of the road.

The Laggan Burn in 1909 was considered to be suitable for the production of electricity via a hydroelectric power plant.

Memorials in Dunscore Old Kirk burial ground record details of the Ireland and Fergusson families of Carse Mill.

== See also ==
- Friar's Carse
