= Dunscore =

Coordinates: 55.142°N 3.7801°W

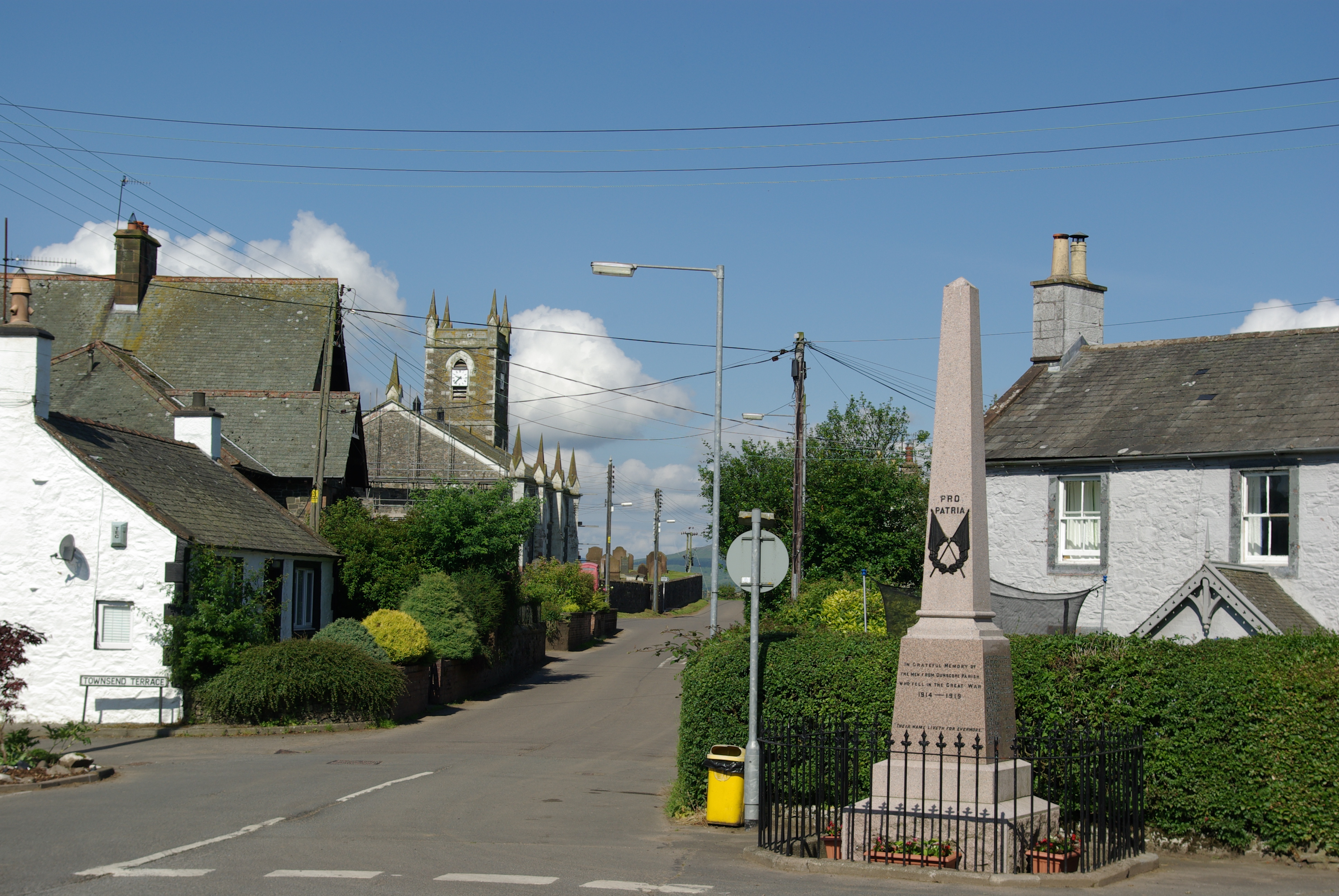
- Dunscore village and War Memorial

- Location within Dumfries and Galloway
- Council area: Dumfries and Galloway
- Country: Scotland
- Sovereign state: United Kingdom
- Police: Scotland
- Fire: Scottish
- Ambulance: Scottish
- UK Parliament: Dumfries and Galloway

Dunscore (/ˈdʌnskər/ DUN-skər, less commonly /ˈdʌnskɔːr/ DUN-skor) is a small village which lies 9 miles (14 km) northwest of Dumfries on the B729, in Dumfriesshire, in the District Council Region of Dumfries and Galloway, southwest Scotland.

The village consists of about 150 people and has a church, a community run pub, and a hosted post office three times a week. The village hosts a gala event every August.

It is the birthplace of the Church of Scotland missionary Jane Haining, one of only ten Holocaust victims from Scotland.

Dunscore has been an active Fairtrade Community since 2009.

The Dunscore railway station opened in 1905, and closed to passengers in 1943 and to goods in 1949. The station was on the Cairn Valley Railway which ran to Moniaive from Dumfries.

Craigenputtock Estate is within the Civil Parish of Dunscore.

== Etymology ==
The name Dunscore is of Cumbric origin, formed of the elements dīn 'fort' and *ïsgor 'fortification, rampart'. William J. Watson proposes the meaning "fort of the bulwark or rampart".

== The Church ==
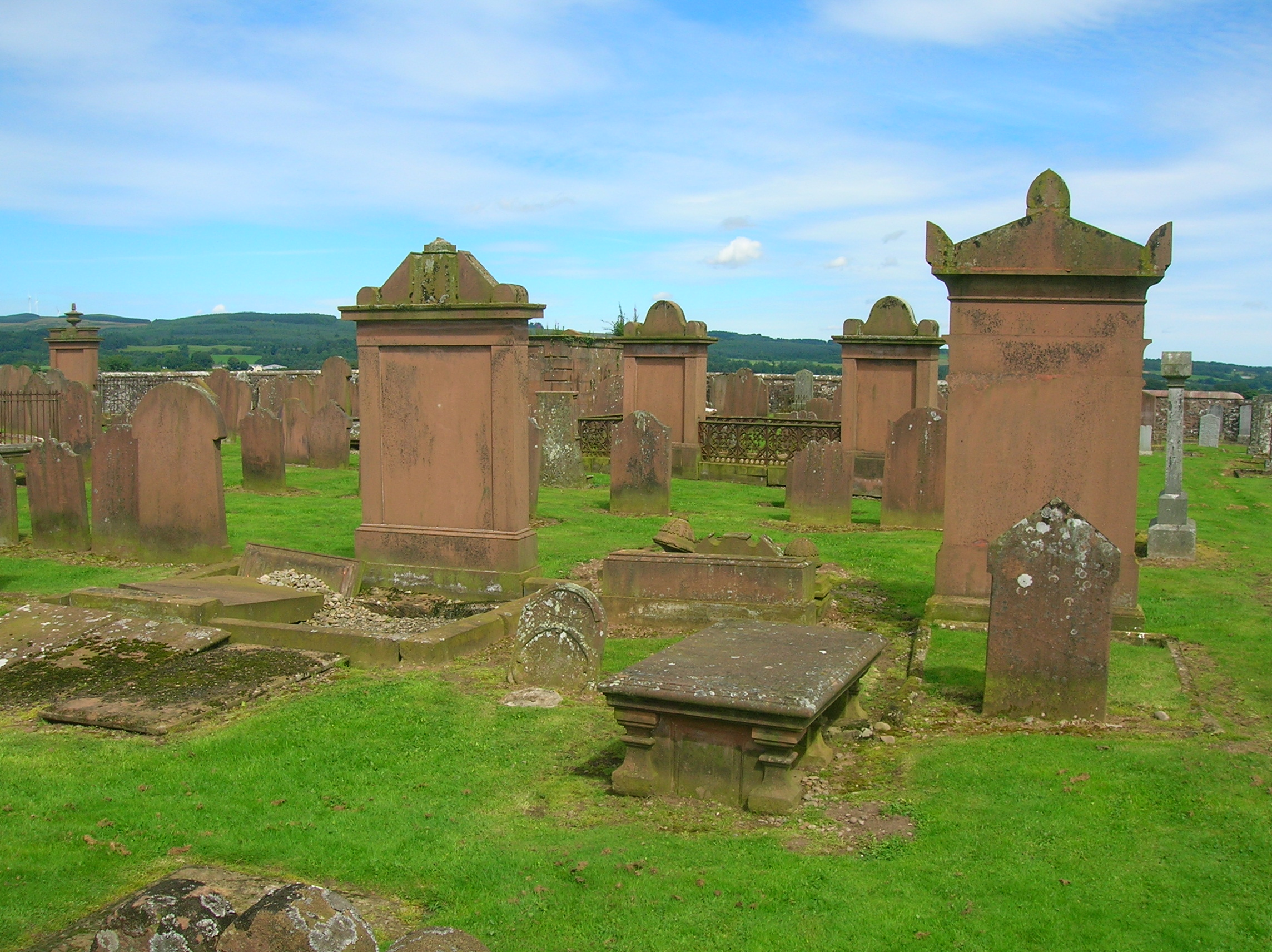
Dunscore Old Kirk burial ground.

There is a parish church of Dunscore.

The long abandoned Dunscore Old Kirk was located near Fardingwell Farm, between Robert Burns' Ellisland Farm and Robert Ferguson's "Isle Tower".

In Thompson's 1832 map, Ellisland was spelt "Elliesland" and was next to Isle Tower.

The 'Laird of Lag's Tomb' is located at the surviving "Dunscore Old Kirk" burial ground, as is the grave of Captain Robert Riddell of Glenriddell, a close associate of Robert Burns.

The church was rebuilt into a heritage centre in 2017, and features information on the Dunscore-born Jane Haining.

== Lag Tower ==
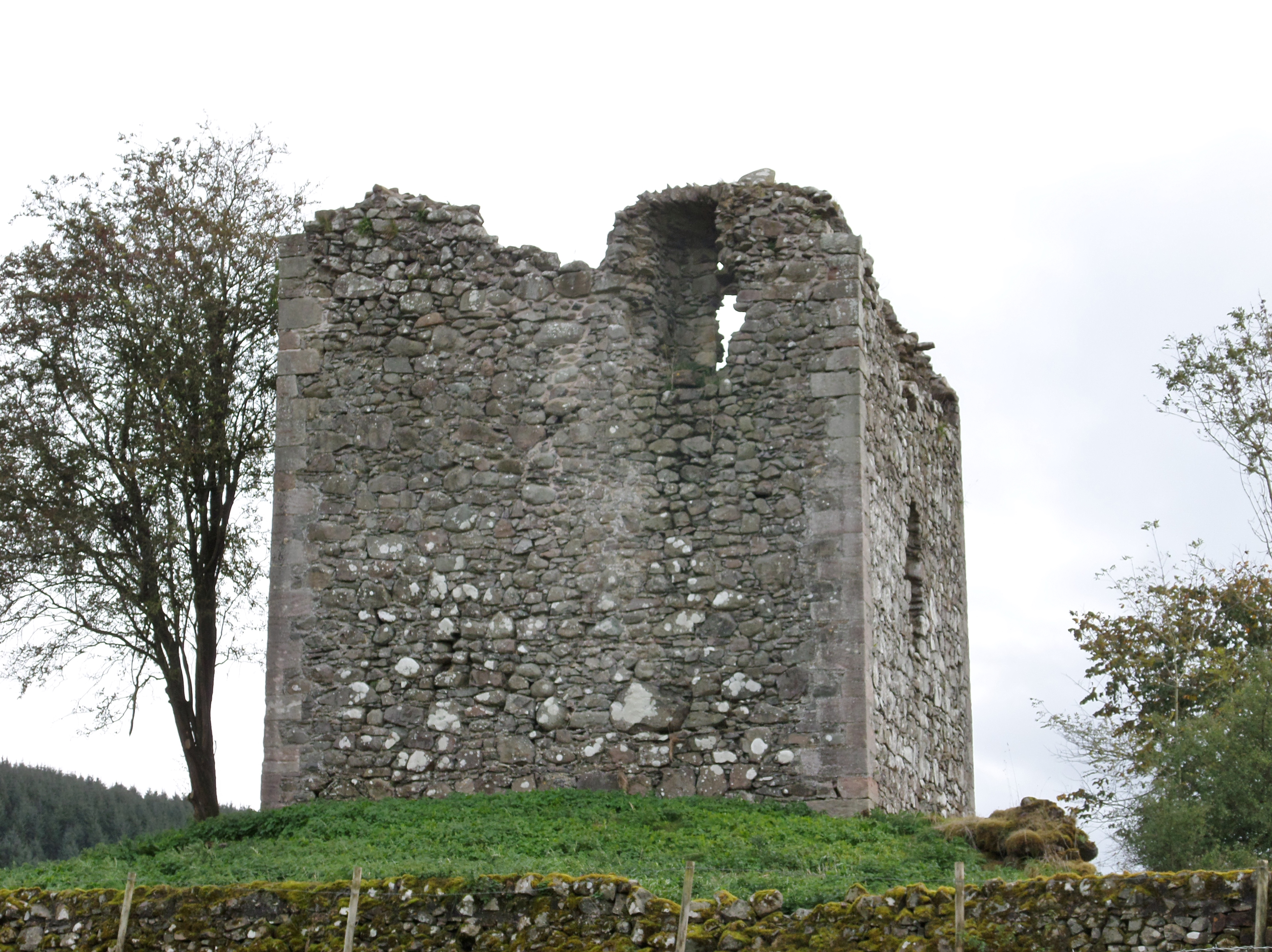
Lag Tower

Lag (or Lagg) Tower is a ruinous fortification lying on high ground north-east of Dunscore, north of the Laggan Burn. The structure dates from the 15th or 16th century and was originally four storeys high with a walled courtyard at its base. From the 14th Century, the site was the home of the Grierson family, which was responsible for building the tower. Roger Grierson of Lagg was killed at the Battle of Sauchieburn in 1488 and several family members were killed at the Battle of Flodden in 1513. In 1685 Robert Grierson of Lagg was a persecutor of the Covenanters.
