= Dalswinton =

Scottish village

Coordinates: 55°09′N 3°40′W

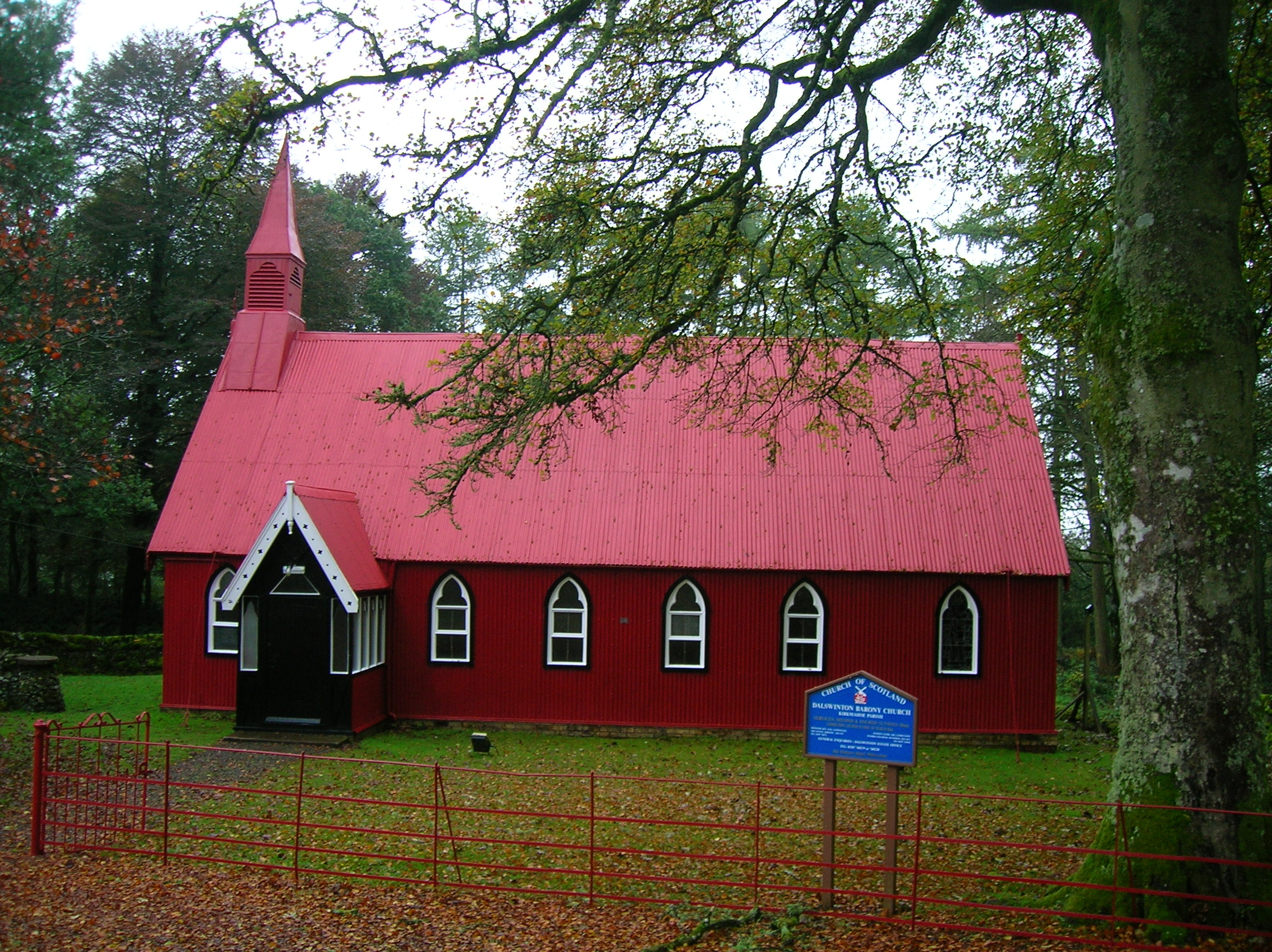
Dalswinton Barony Church.

Dalswinton is a small village in the historical county of Dumfriesshire in Dumfries and Galloway in the south of Scotland. It is located about six miles (ten kilometres) northwest of Dumfries. To the east of the village a wind farm has been built with a capacity of 30 MW. Patrick Miller the entrepreneur built Dalswinton House and its surroundings, which today remain largely in their original form: the stable block situated below the main house and the walled garden; the village; the farms with the enclosed fields; all the cottages which were to house the farm workers and, finally, the loch. It was, perhaps, this for which he is most renowned, as it was on here that the first steamboat in Britain made its maiden voyage.

The name Dalswinton contains the Old English place-name swīn-tūn 'pig farm', to which Gaelic dál 'haugh or water meadow' has been added.
