= Kirkland railway station =

Former railway station in Scotland

Coordinates: 55.1872°N 3.8692°W

Kirkland

General information
- Location: Dunscore, Dumfries and Galloway; Scotland
- Platforms: 1

Other information
- Status: Disused

History
- Original company: Cairn Valley Light Railway
- Pre-grouping: Glasgow and South Western Railway
- Post-grouping: London, Midland and Scottish Railway

Key dates
- 1 March 1905: Opened
- 3 May 1943: Closed to passengers
- 4 July 1949: Closed to freight
Location

Kirkland railway station (NX810897) was one of the minor stations on the Cairn Valley Light Railway branch, from Dumfries. It served the rural area around Kirkland as a request stop, close to the terminus at Moniaive in Dumfries and Galloway The line was closed to passengers during WW2.

== History ==
The CVR was nominally independent, but was in reality controlled by the Glasgow and South Western Railway. The line was closed to passengers on 3 May 1943, during WW2 and to freight on 4 July 1949, and the track lifted in 1953.

The station had a simple tin shelter and a short siding with a loading bank. A station master's house was provided, designed by the company with a pyramid roof truncated by a central chimney stack. The shelter had been demolished by 1949. The stationmaster's house survives as a private dwelling.

The siding was worked by down trains only, goods for Dumfries being taken to the nearest station along. The points were unlocked with an Annett's key that was kept in a locked box on a post adjacent to the point.

Trains were controlled by a 'lock and block' system whereby the trains operated treadles on the single line to interact with the block instruments.

== See also ==
- List of closed railway stations in Britain

Preceding station	Historical railways	Following station
Crossford	Glasgow and South Western Railway; Cairn Valley Railway	Moniaive
