= Dunscore railway station =

Former railway station in Scotland

Coordinates: 55.1379°N 3.7924°W

Dunscore
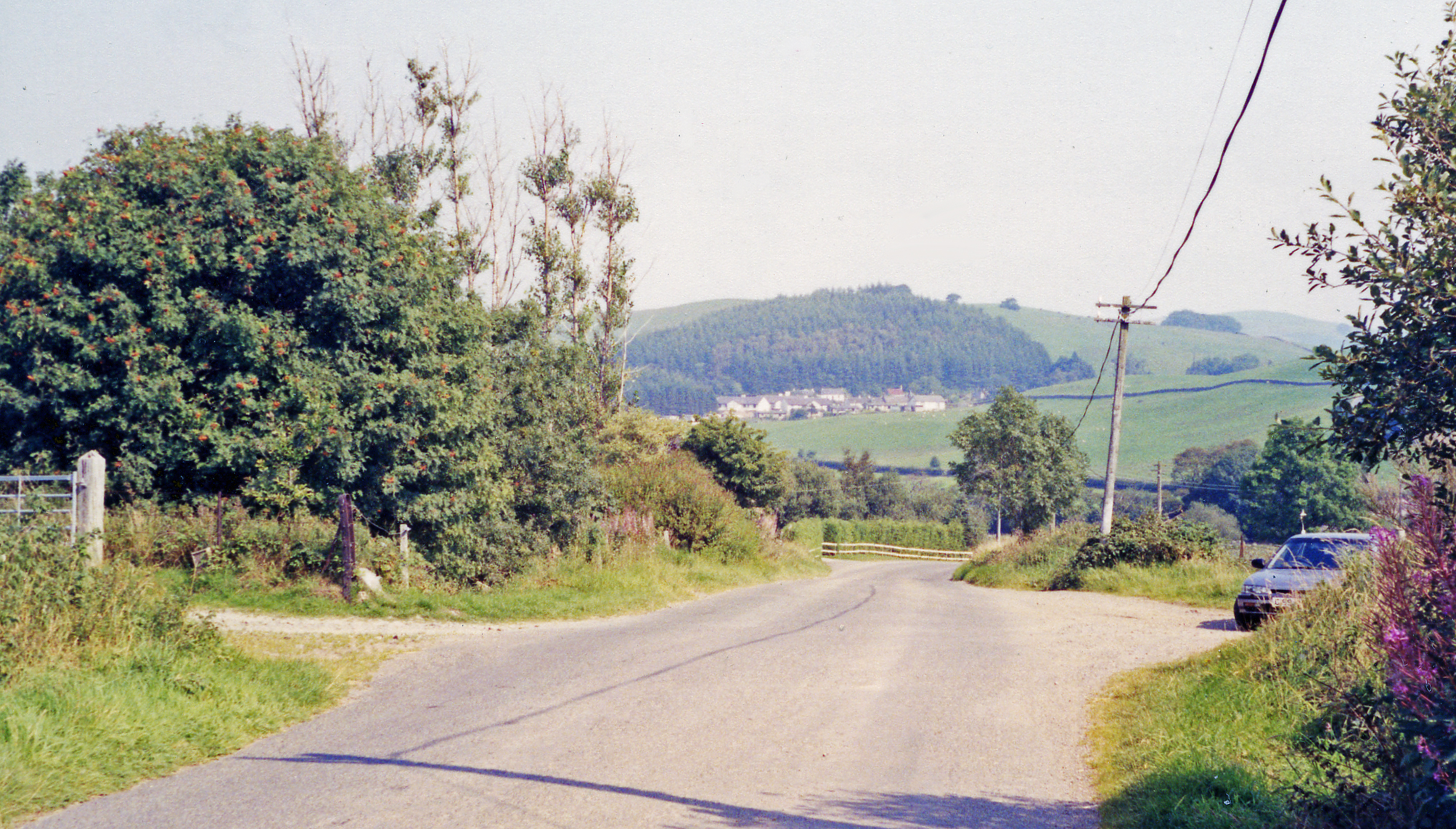
- Site of the station in 1991

General information
- Location: Dunscore, Dumfries and Galloway; Scotland

Other information
- Status: Disused

History
- Original company: Cairn Valley Light Railway
- Pre-grouping: Glasgow and South Western Railway
- Post-grouping: London, Midland and Scottish Railway

Key dates
- 1 March 1905: Opened
- 3 May 1943: Closed to passengers
- 4 July 1949: Closed to freight
Location

Dunscore (NX858840) was one of the four principal stations on the Cairn Valley Light Railway (CVR) branch, from Dumfries. It served the rural area of Dunscore in Dumfries and Galloway. The line was closed to passengers during the war in WW2.

== History ==
The CVR was nominally independent, but was in reality controlled by the Glasgow and South Western Railway. The line was closed to passengers on 3 May 1943, during WW2 and to freight on 4 July 1949, and the track lifted in 1953.

The station cost £212 to build in red brick with cream painted poster boards and chocolate-coloured framing. The extension over the front was covered with red tiles, as was the main roof. A booking office and waiting room was provided. Water columns and tanks were fitted at each end of the station platform. A station master's house was provided

A three-arched red brick-faced viaduct crossed the River Cairn just below the station. Electrically controlled home and starter signals were present for both directions and a telephone system was provided for communication between stations. In about 1936 the London Midland and Scottish Railway removed the original signals and the line was worked by a brass Key Token Trains, however replacement signals were provided to control the passing loop.

Trains were controlled by a 'lock and block' system whereby the trains operated treadles on the single line to interact with the block instruments.

== See also ==
- List of closed railway stations in Britain

Preceding station	Historical railways	Following station
Stepford	Glasgow and South Western Railway; Cairn Valley Railway	Crossford
