= Craigdarroch =

House in Dumfries and Galloway, Scotland

Coordinates: 55.1961°N 3.9792°W

"Craigdarroch, An Accessory to Murder" is an expansion set for the board game Kill Doctor Lucky

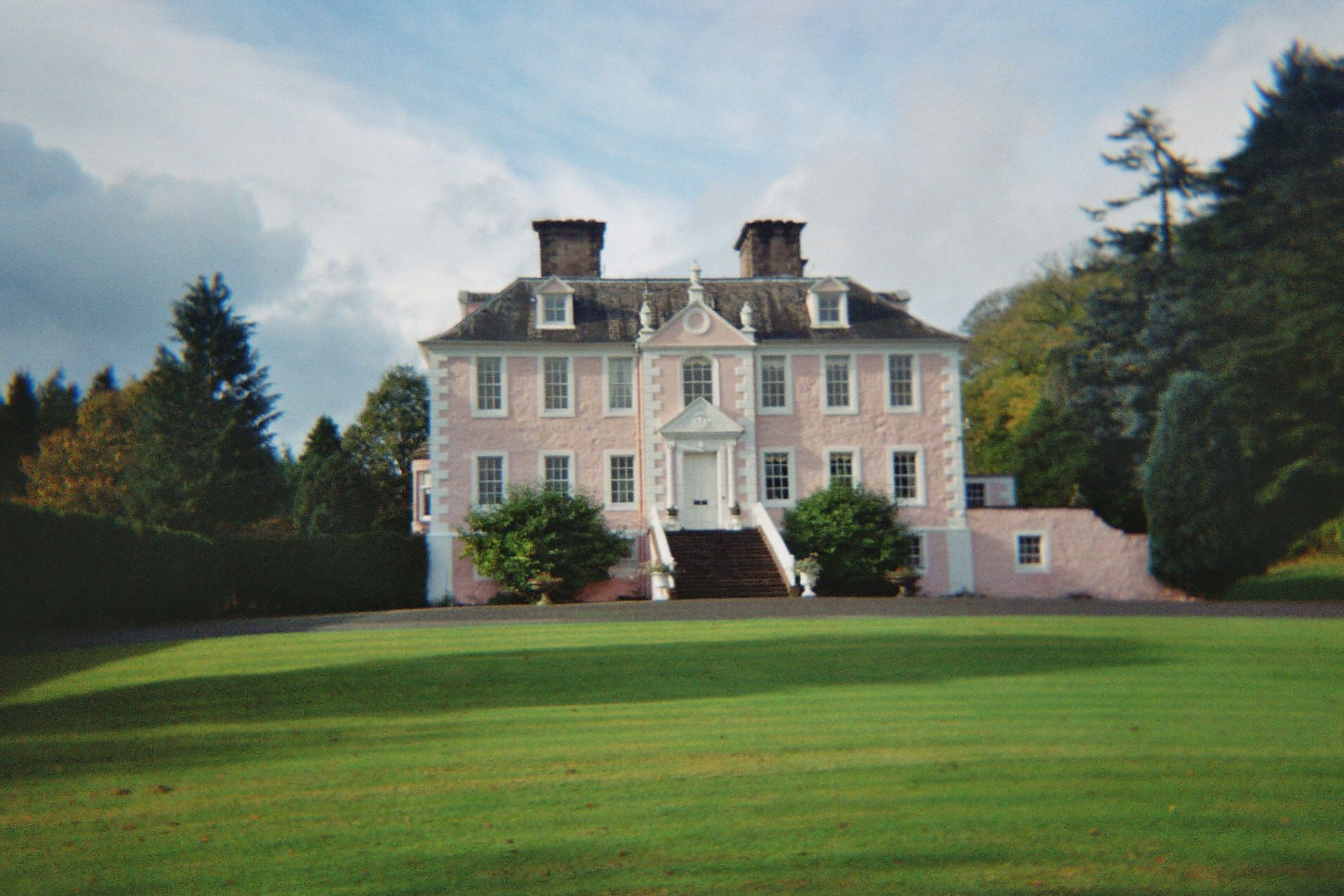
Craigdarroch House 2005

Craigdarroch is a house near Moniaive, Dumfries and Galloway, Scotland. It was the seat of the Chief of the Dumfriesshire Fergussons for 600 years. Built by William Adam in 1729 over the old house dating from the earliest records (14th century).

The Marriage Home of Annie Laurie (the heroine of 'the world's greatest love-song') who married Alexander Fergusson, 14th Laird of Craigdarroch, on 29 August 1709, and lived there for 33 years.

The first Fergusson of Craigdarroch on record was Jonkyne, who flourished in the 14th century. Robert, his descendant in the 6th generation, married Lady Janet Cunningham, daughter of the 4th Earl of Glencairn of Maxwelton, in 1537 and their marriage stone, with the shakefork of the Cunninghams, is to be seen with the other carved stones on the base of the old tower of Craigdarroch. The upper part of the tower was demolished when the present early 18th-century house was built.

Their eldest grandson, Thomas, married in 1609 (marriage stone), but died soon after, without inheriting. His younger brother, Robert, married Katherine, daughter of the 6th Earl of Cunningham, and their son, William Fergusson had a marriage contract with Sara Grierson, which was signed on 9 May 1621, daughter of Sir William Grierson of Lag, 9th Lord of Lag and their marriage stone, with the three cushions and star of the Griersons, is also to be seen. Robert was M.P. for Dumfriesshire, as were also his son, his grandson, and his great-grandson.

His grandson, John, Colonel of a Regiment of Foot, rode from Craigdarroch to Killiecrankie in 1689, where he was killed in battle. His servant returned with his master's horse and saddle and the saddle was kept at the top of the stairs until 1918 when it went to Caprington Castle where it still is. The story goes that his wife, Elizabeth, refused to believe her husband was dead and pined her days away waiting for his return, and subsequently haunted the saddle right up until 1920 when the ghost was laid by a Jesuit with Bell, Book and Candle. There is no doubt about the ghost, and no doubt about the laying of it, but history records that Elizabeth married twice afterwards, and the ghost was more probably Elizabeth Maxwell, John's mother.

His son, Alexander, born in 1685, actively supported King William against the Stuarts. In 1710 he married Anna Laurie or Annie Laurie, daughter of Sir Robert Laurie, Bt., of Maxwelton House, near Moniaive, the Annie Laurie of the song. In 1726 they commissioned William Adam, father of Robert Adam, Scotland's most famous architect, to build the new house. The estimate for the work in William Adam's handwriting (copy in the house) came to the then princely sum of £526 2s 9d. It was completed, much as it is today, in 1729, the date above the present front door. Robert Adam, then under his father's tuition, designed and made the fireplace in the hall. "Annie Laurie" lived at Craigdarroch for over 50 years and died at Friars' Carse, near Auldgirth, in 1763. Some sources suggest she may have been buried at Craigdarroch, but as she was a lifelong worshipper at Kirkland Church, her grave may be there, but it has not been located.

Their son James, Chamberlain to the 3rd Duke of Queensberry, lived all his life at Drumlanrig Castle and was there when 'Bonnie Prince Charlie' came with his Highland Army in December 1745. The Highland Army was not popular in the district and did considerable damage as it passed through. At Craigdarroch, the Fergussons and staff wisely decided to flee the house when they were requested to provide hospitality to the pretender. When the coast was clear they returned, only to find the house ransacked and much of the furniture burnt as fuel.

His son Alexander was the victor in the contest for the Whistle, celebrated in Robert Burns' poem. The actual whistle is an heirloom, also at Caprington Castle

Alexander's son, Robert, 17th Laird, was perhaps the most distinguished member of the family. He was a lawyer, Attorney-General of Bengal, later, M.P. for the Stewartry of Kirkcudbright, Judge Advocate General and a Privy Councillor. He built the 'pond', turned the course of Craigdarroch Water, laid out the policies much as they are now, and built the west wing.

His grandson, Robert, died in 1904, leaving no heir - for the first time in 600 years - but twin daughters, the elder of whom, Ella, married William Cunninghame, 14th Laird of Caprington, descendant of the Earls of Glencairn, in 1918, and their elder son Robert inherited the castle and property.

After 1904 the house was occasionally rented by Clare Dubs who bought it in 1923, living there until he died in 1943 when it passed to his nephew (by marriage), Robert Sinclair Scott, who sold it in 1957 to Adam Dalzell who died in 1961.

In 1962 it was acquired by the present occupant's now deceased father-in-law whose wife's uncle was a Fergusson, kinsman to the Fergussons of Craigdarroch.

During the 19th century various alterations and additions were made - the Oriel window in the drawing-room; the Chapel, built in 1889 of oak and stone from the estate; and later the billiard room wing, replacing former conservatories, and rebuilt in 1932 as the present study. In the chapel there are photographs of the 50 or so estate workers and their families all together in their Sunday finery at the turn of the 20th century. Some of them would have worked in the extensive walled garden and greenhouses, now derelict, to provide produce for the house. Others would have worked on the local tenanted farms and in forestry on the estate.

During the late war (1939–1945) the house was allocated to a special unit of the Norwegian Army since when it has been lived in for short periods only until the present occupation. Modern conditions do not encourage developments and improvements, but they continue slowly. In recent years the house has been used for events and meetings and plans are in progress to use it as a wedding and function venue.

Craigdarroch House is open to the public throughout July each year from 2 p.m. to 4 p.m. It is situated 2 miles west of Moniaive on the B729.
