= Alexander Fergusson =

Scottish politician

Alexander Fergusson (1685–1749) was a Scottish politician who sat in the House of Commons from 1715 to 1722.

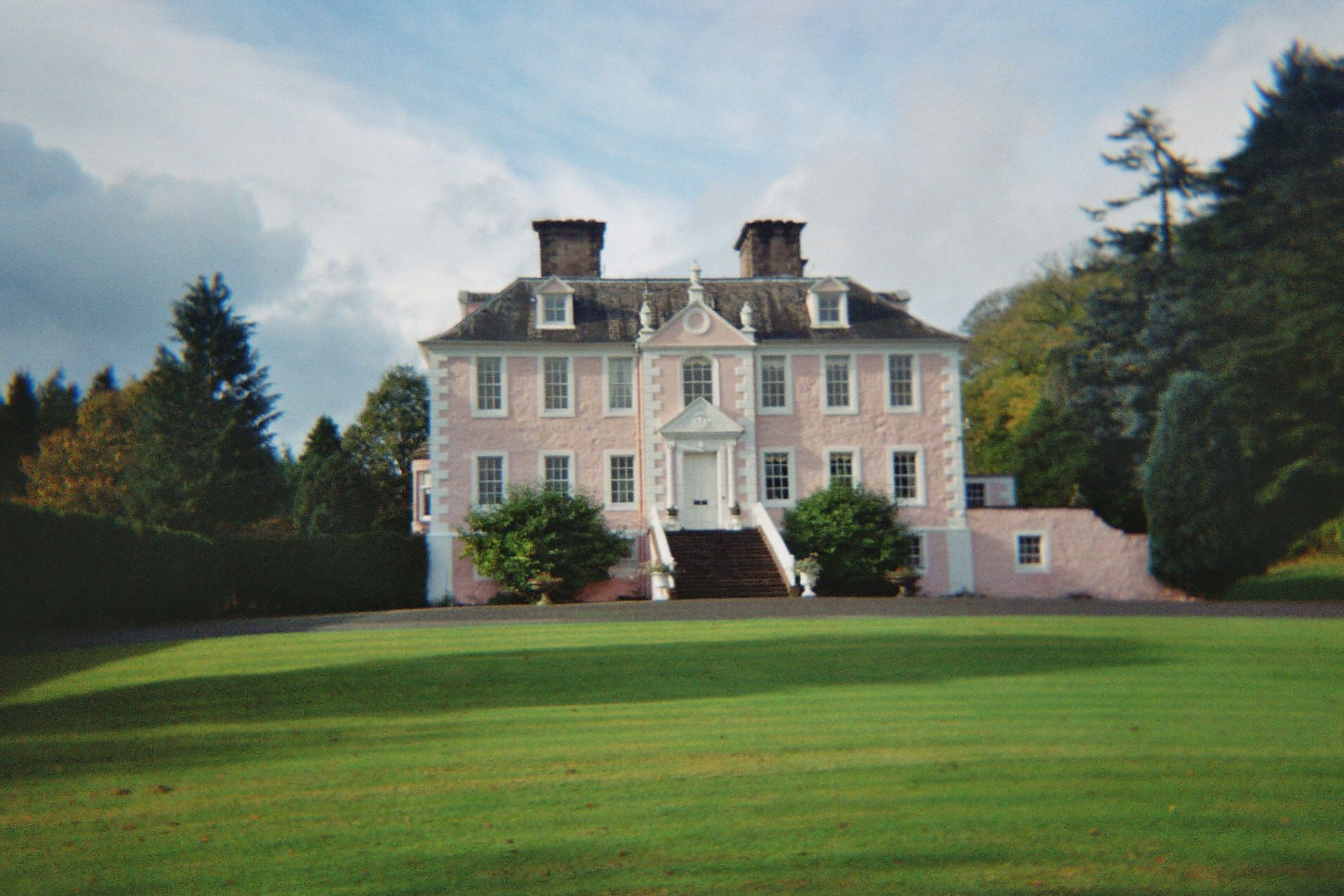
Craigdarroch House

Fergusson was the eldest surviving son of John Fergusson of Craigdarroch and his wife Elizabeth McGhie, daughter of Alexander McGhie of Balmaghie, Kirkcudbright. He succeeded his father in 1689, inheriting Craigdarroch House.

He married on 29 August 1709, Anna (‘Annie Laurie’ of the song), the daughter of Sir Robert Laurie, 1st Bt., of Maxwelton, Kirkcudbright, and with her had at least 2 sons and 2 daughters.

At the 1715 general election he was returned unopposed as Member of Parliament for Dumfries Burghs, but was defeated in a contest at the 1722 general election

Fergusson died on 8 March 1749.

Parliament of Great Britain
Preceded by Sir William Johnstone	Member of Parliament for Dumfries Burghs; 1715–1722	Succeeded by William Douglas
