= Crossford =

Crossford may refer to:

- Crossford, Dumfries and Galloway, Scotland
  - formerly served by Crossford railway station
- Crossford, Fife, Scotland
- Crossford, South Lanarkshire, Scotland
