= Stepford railway station =

Former railway station in Scotland

Coordinates: 55.1153°N 3.7822°W

General information
- Location: Stepford, Dumfries and Galloway; Scotland
- Platforms: 1

Other information
- Status: Disused

History
- Original company: Cairn Valley Railway
- Pre-grouping: Glasgow & South Western

Key dates
- 1 March 1905: Opened
- 3 May 1943: Closed to passengers
- 4 July 1949: Closed to freight
Location

Stepford (NX864815) was one of the minor request stop stations on the Cairn Valley Light Railway branch from Dumfries. It served a very rural area in Dumfries and Galloway. The line was closed to passengers during the Second World War.

== History ==
The CVR was nominally independent, but was in reality controlled by the Glasgow and South Western Railway. The line was closed to passengers on 3 May 1943, during the Second World War and to freight on 4 July 1949, and the track lifted in 1953.

The station was very basic with just a short wooden platform with a tin shelter and a siding with a loading bank for goods traffic. A station master's house was provided, designed by the company with a pyramid roof truncated by a central chimney stack. The shelter had been demolished by 1949. The station master's house, a simple cottage, rather than the standard company design, survives as a private dwelling.

Morrington Quarry was nearby and was rail connected, however the contract was lost to a road haulier in around 1943.

The siding was worked by down trains only, goods for Dumfries being taken to the nearest station along. The points were unlocked with an Annett's key that was kept in a locked box on a post adjacent to the point.

Trains were controlled by a 'lock and block' system whereby the trains operated treadles on the single line to interact with the block instruments.

== See also ==
- List of closed railway stations in Britain

Preceding station	Historical railways	Following station
Newtonairds	Glasgow and South Western Railway; Cairn Valley Railway	Dunscore
