= Maxwelton =

Historic house in Tennessee, United States

- U.S. National Register of Historic Places
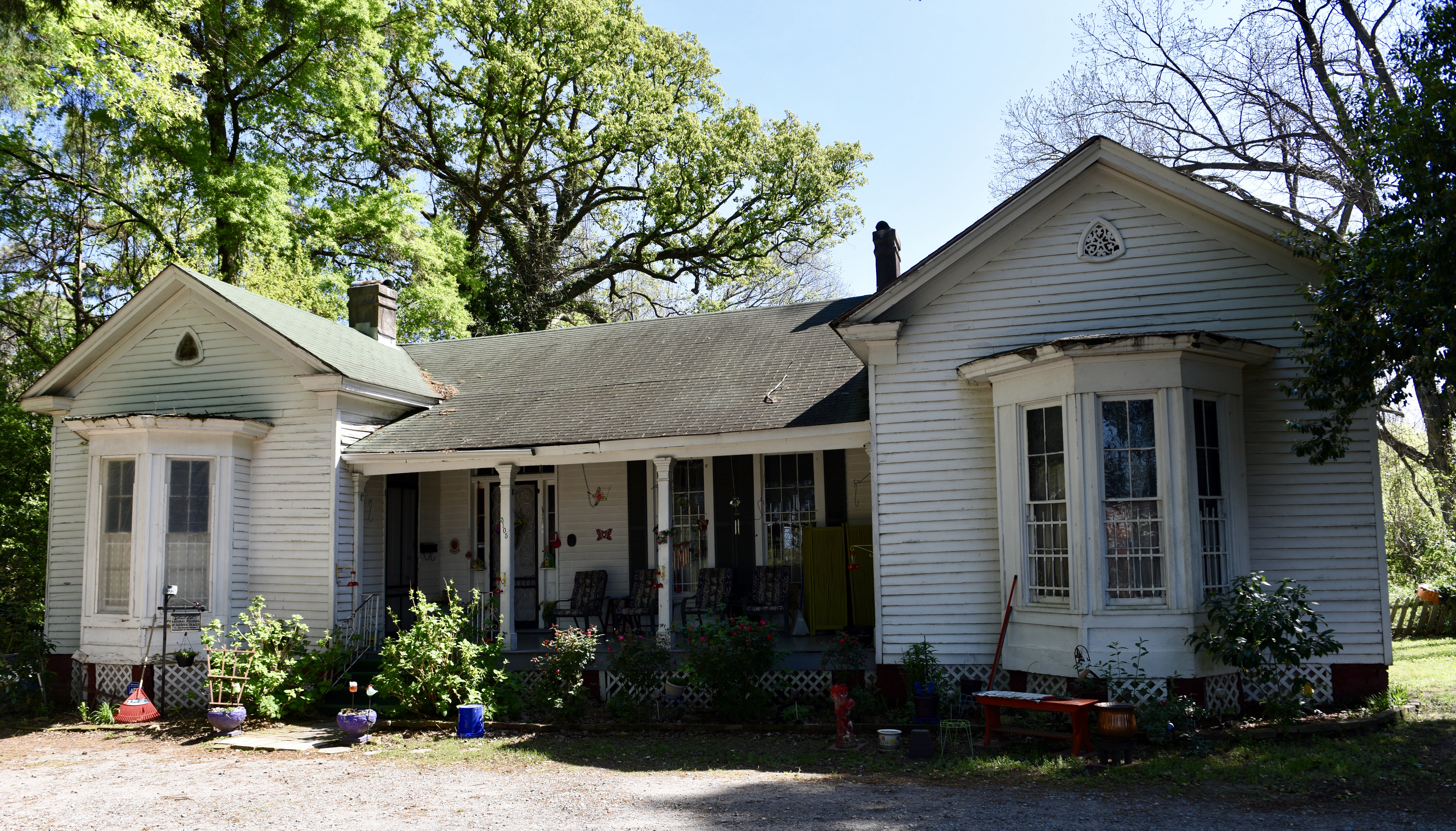

- Location within Tennessee Location within the United States
- Location: 3105 Southern Ave. Memphis, Tennessee
- Coordinates: 35°6′53″N 89°57′27″W
- Area: 1.5 acres (0.61 ha)
- Architectural style: Late Victorian, Pianobox
- NRHP reference No.: 80003866
- Added to NRHP: March 10, 1980

Maxwelton is a historic single-story house in Memphis, Tennessee, that is listed on the National Register of Historic Places. It is the only extant example in Memphis of a Victorian piano box house. It is currently a private residence.

The piano box house is a vernacular architectural style found in houses built in Middle and West Tennessee, from the mid-19th century into the early part of the 20th century. These one-story houses acquired the name "piano box" from their shape, which was seen to resemble that of a rectangular grand piano.

Maxwelton was built around 1860 from Tennessee native Poplar and Cypress woods. It features a long recessed central porch between two flanking parlors. The interior of the home has 14-foot (4.3 m) ceilings. Its floors are made from 4-inch (100 mm) pine boards. There are five fireplaces with wooden mantels and some have ornately tiled hearths. It is named after a famed estate Maxwelton House home of Annie Laurie in Dumfriesshire, Scotland.

Judge John Louis Taylor Sneed purchased the home in 1874. The home has been in the Sneed - Ewell family for four generations. Upon Judge Sneed's death, his wife inherited Maxwelton. Since the couple had no children, after her death the home was passed to her nephew, John Sneed Webb and then to Webb's daughter, Kathleen. In 1918 Kathleen was married in the home to Arthur Peyton Ewell and they had two sons, Arthur Webb Ewell and John Sneed Ewell, both of whom were born in Maxwelton's west bedroom.

Maxwelton was placed on the National Register of Historic Places in 1980.
