= Irongray railway station =

Former railway station in Scotland

Coordinates: 55.1060°N 3.6983°W

Irongray
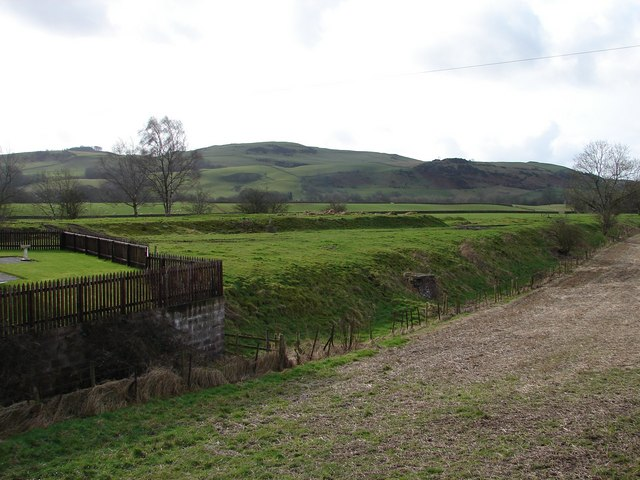
- The site of Irongray railway station

General information
- Location: Dunscore, Dumfries and Galloway; Scotland
- Grid reference: NX917803

Other information
- Status: Disused

History
- Original company: Cairn Valley Light Railway
- Pre-grouping: Glasgow and South Western Railway
- Post-grouping: London, Midland and Scottish Railway

Key dates
- 1 March 1905: Opened
- 3 May 1943: Closed to passengers
- 4 July 1949: Closed to freight
Location

Irongray was one of the principal stations on the Cairn Valley Light Railway branch, from Dumfries. It served a rural area in Dumfries and Galloway The line was closed to passengers during WW2. Cairn Valley Junction lay to the east.

== History ==
The CVR was nominally independent, but was in reality controlled by the Glasgow and South Western Railway. The line was closed to passengers on 3 May 1943, during WW2 and to freight on 4 July 1949, and the track lifted in 1953.

The station cost £212 to build in red brick with cream painted poster boards and chocolate-coloured framing. The extension over the front was covered with red tiles, as was the main roof. A booking office and waiting room was provided. A station master's house was provided, designed by the company with a pyramid roof truncated by a central chimney stack. The shelter had been demolished by 1949. The stationmaster's house survives as a private dwelling.

An accident took place at Irongray in 1911 when a passenger train ran into a goods train that was sitting in the passing loop. No serious injuries were incurred. After 1936 the passing loop was not necessary as the line was operated on a 'one engine in steam' principle; it was removed, however the signal box remained. A level crossing with gates was nearby, interlocked with the signals so that trains could not enter the station unless the gates were closed against road traffic. An electrical ground disc signal controlled the movement of trains from the siding onto the main line.

Trains were controlled by a 'lock and block' system whereby the trains operated treadles on the single line to interact with the block instruments.

== See also ==
- List of closed railway stations in Britain

Preceding station	Historical railways	Following station
Dumfries	Glasgow and South Western Railway; Cairn Valley Railway	Newtonairds
