= Moniaive railway station =

Former railway station in Scotland

Coordinates: 55.1958°N 3.9197°W

Moniaive
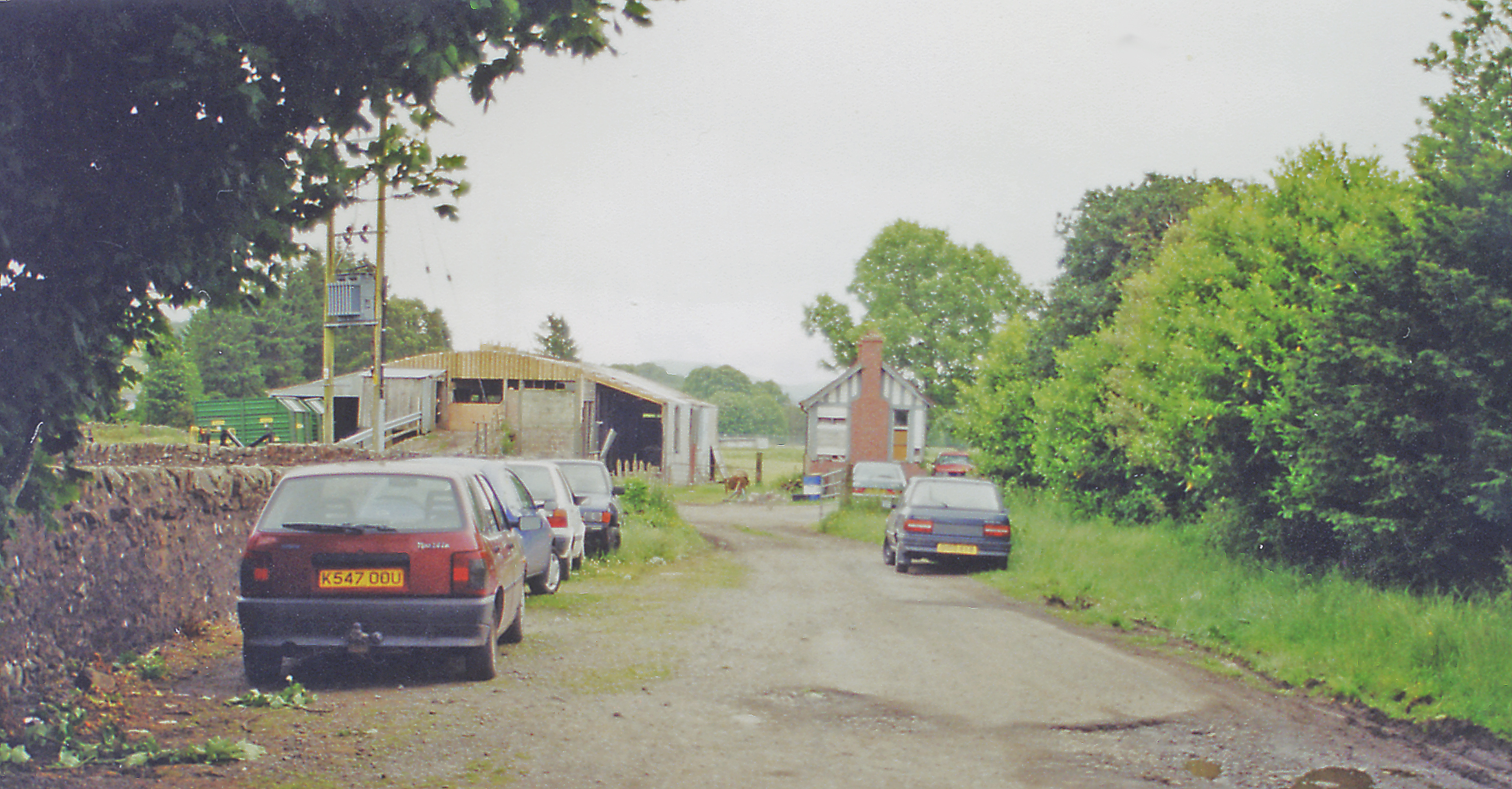
- Site of the station in 2000

General information
- Location: Moniaive, Dumfries and Galloway; Scotland
- Grid reference: NX779907

Other information
- Status: Disused

History
- Original company: Cairn Valley Light Railway
- Pre-grouping: Glasgow and South Western Railway
- Post-grouping: London, Midland and Scottish Railway

Key dates
- 1 March 1905: Opened
- 3 May 1943: Closed to passengers
- 4 July 1949: Closed to all traffic
Location

Moniaive railway station is the closed station terminus of the Cairn Valley Light Railway (CVR) branch, from Dumfries. It served the rural area of Moniaive in Dumfries and Galloway, Scotland.

== History ==
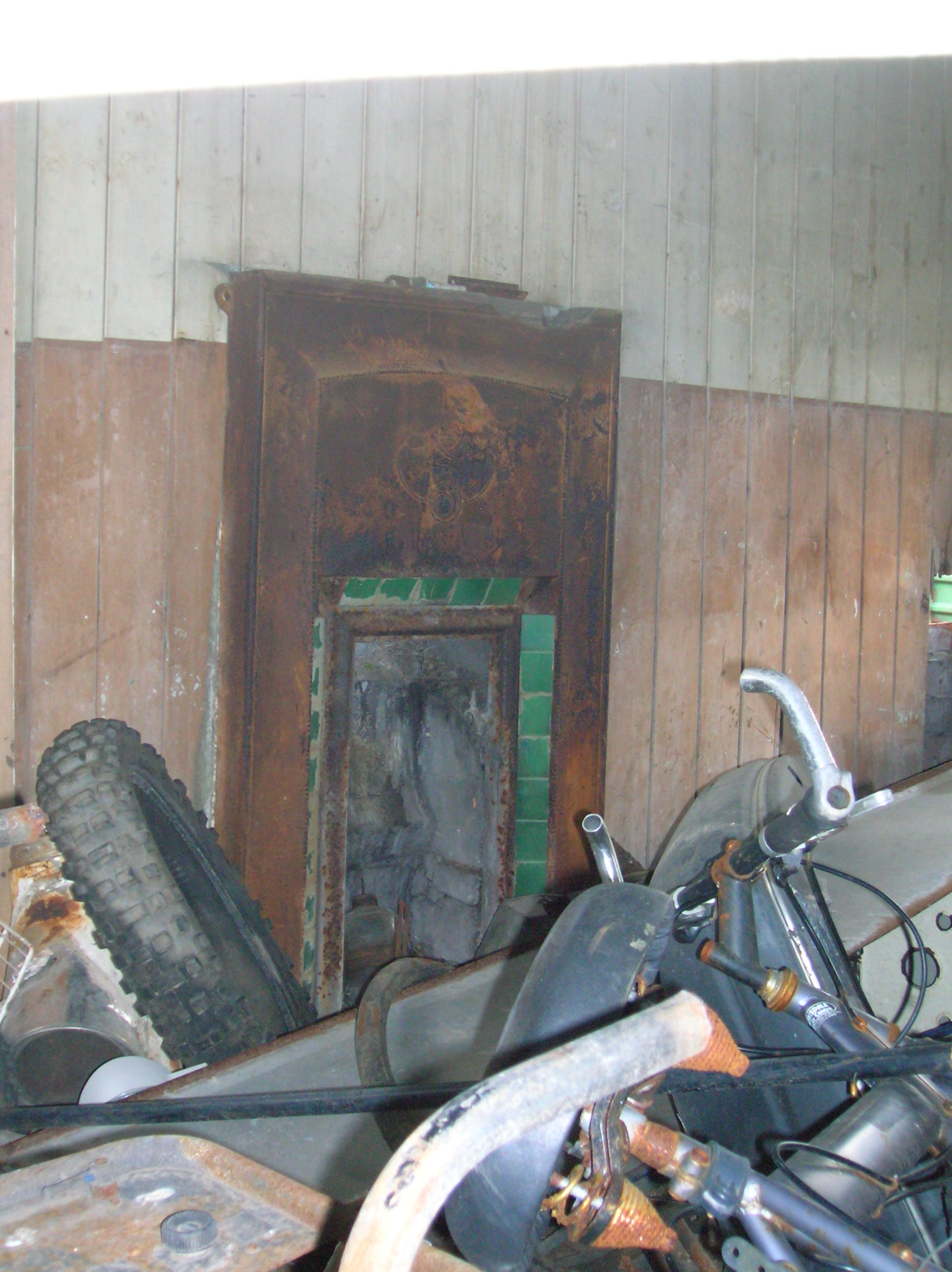
An interior view of the old station master's office

The official opening day was 28 February 1905, accompanied by much local celebration, the first train of six corridor coaches being hauled by a Manson 4-4-0, Number 190. The journey to Dumfries took an hour and cost 2s. 6d. return fare. Archibald Wilkie from Kirkconnel station was Moniaive's first station master, replaced by George MacDonald whose last charge had been Ruthwell station.

From 1906 to 1907 a bus ran from Thornhill to Moniaive to cater for prospective passengers, however it was not a success. The CVR was nominally independent, but was in reality controlled by the Glasgow and South Western Railway. The line was closed to passengers on 3 May 1943, during WW2 and to freight in 1949 on 4 July, and the track lifted in 1953. 1947 is also quoted as a date of complete closure. Moniaive had been one of the last places in Scotland to be connected to the railway network.

Home and starting banner signals were used, electrically controlled, for each direction. Trains were, at that time uniquely, controlled by a development of the Syke's 'lock and block' system whereby the trains operated treadles on the single line to interact with the block instruments.

The station building was extended to provide the station master with his own office in October 1916.

During WW2 large numbers of Norwegian troops travelled to and from Moniaive whilst encamped nearby.

In 1921 the Moniaive engine shed was closed and from that point the first train of the day ran from Dumfries.

In 2014 a proposal was put forward to relocate the station building to the Scottish Railway Preservation Society's Manuel station on the Bo'ness and Kinneil line.

== Views at the station in 2009 ==
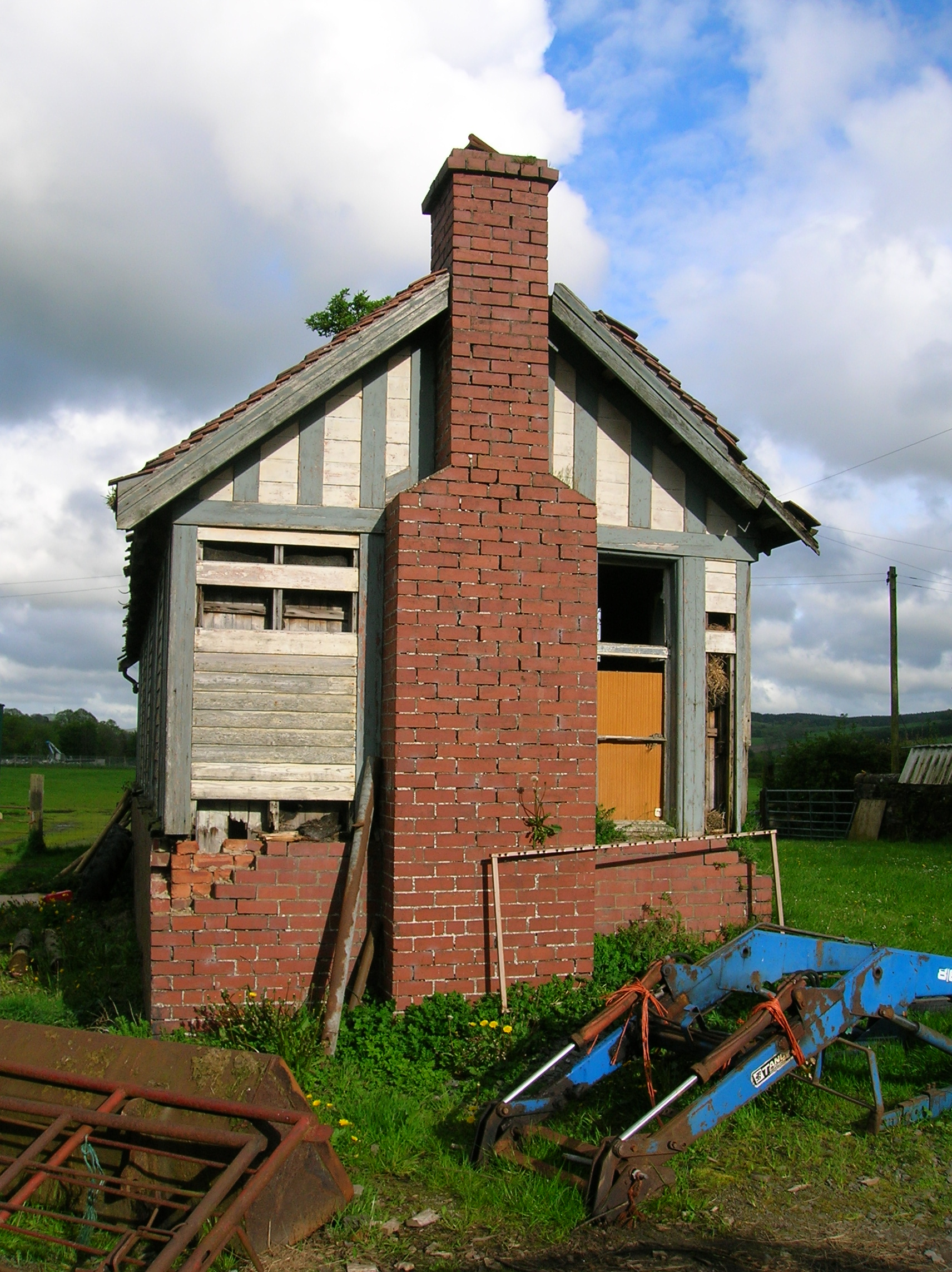
A view from the station entrance

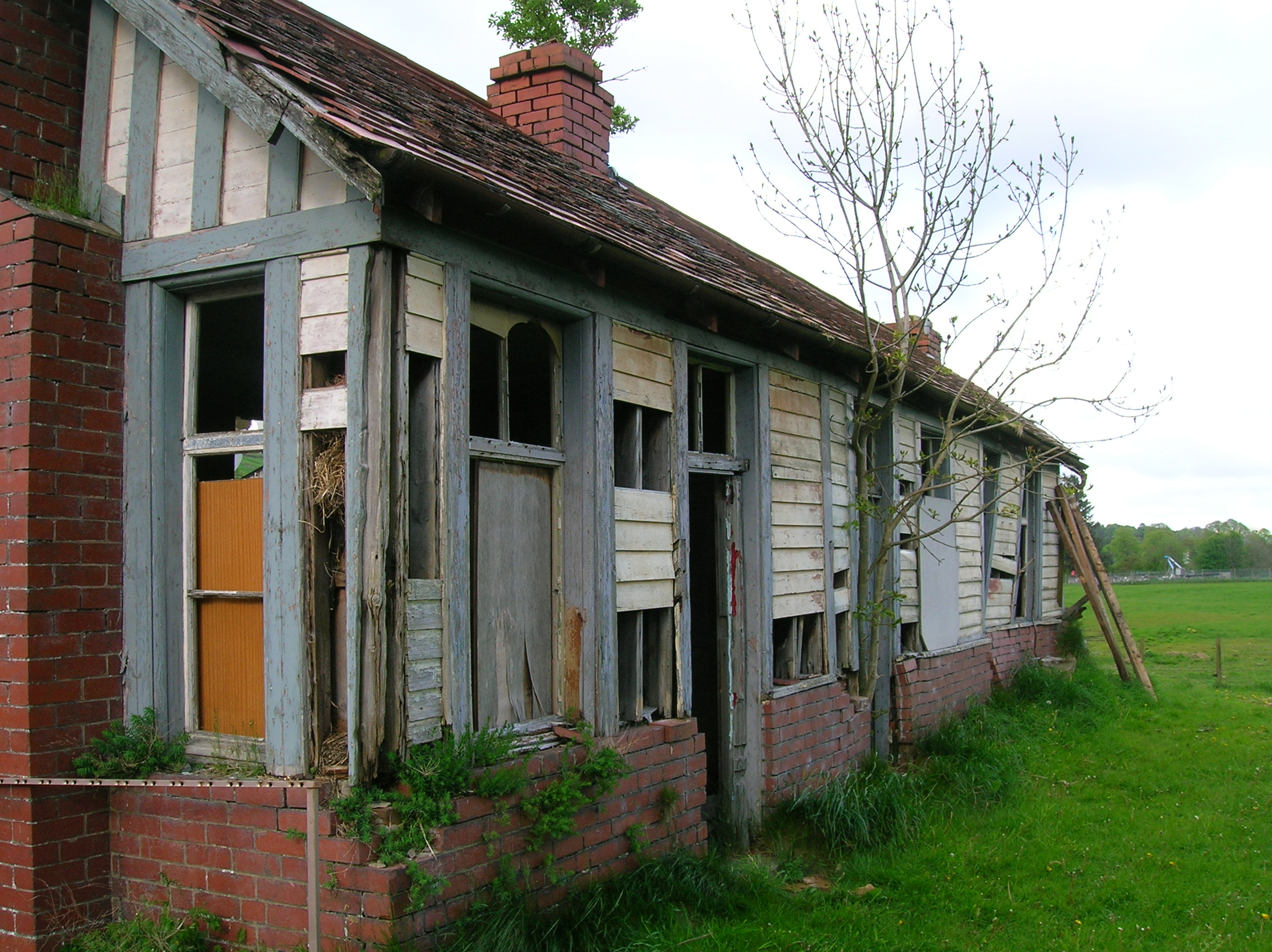
The old station frontage with the station master's office in the foreground.

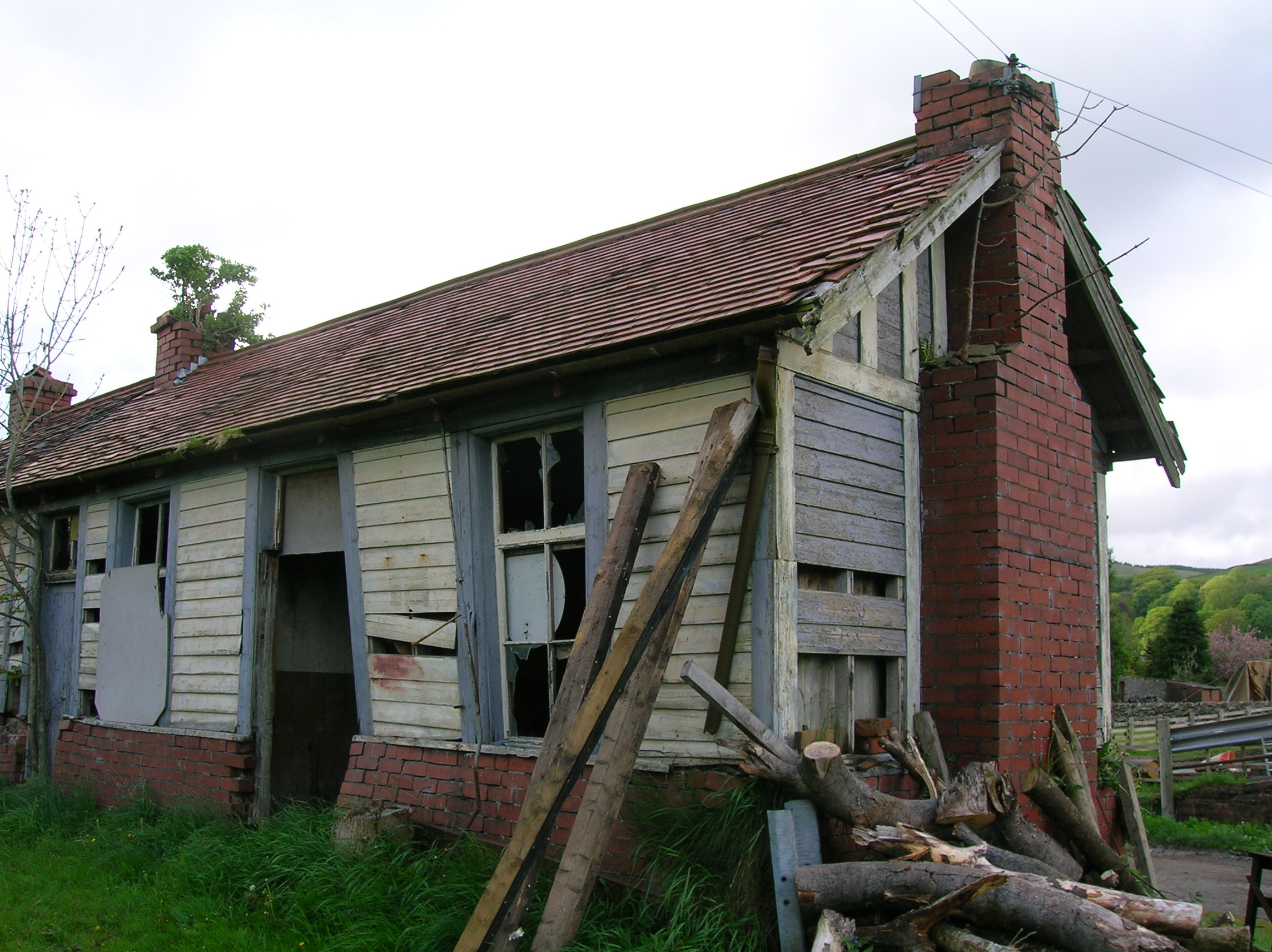
Side and front view

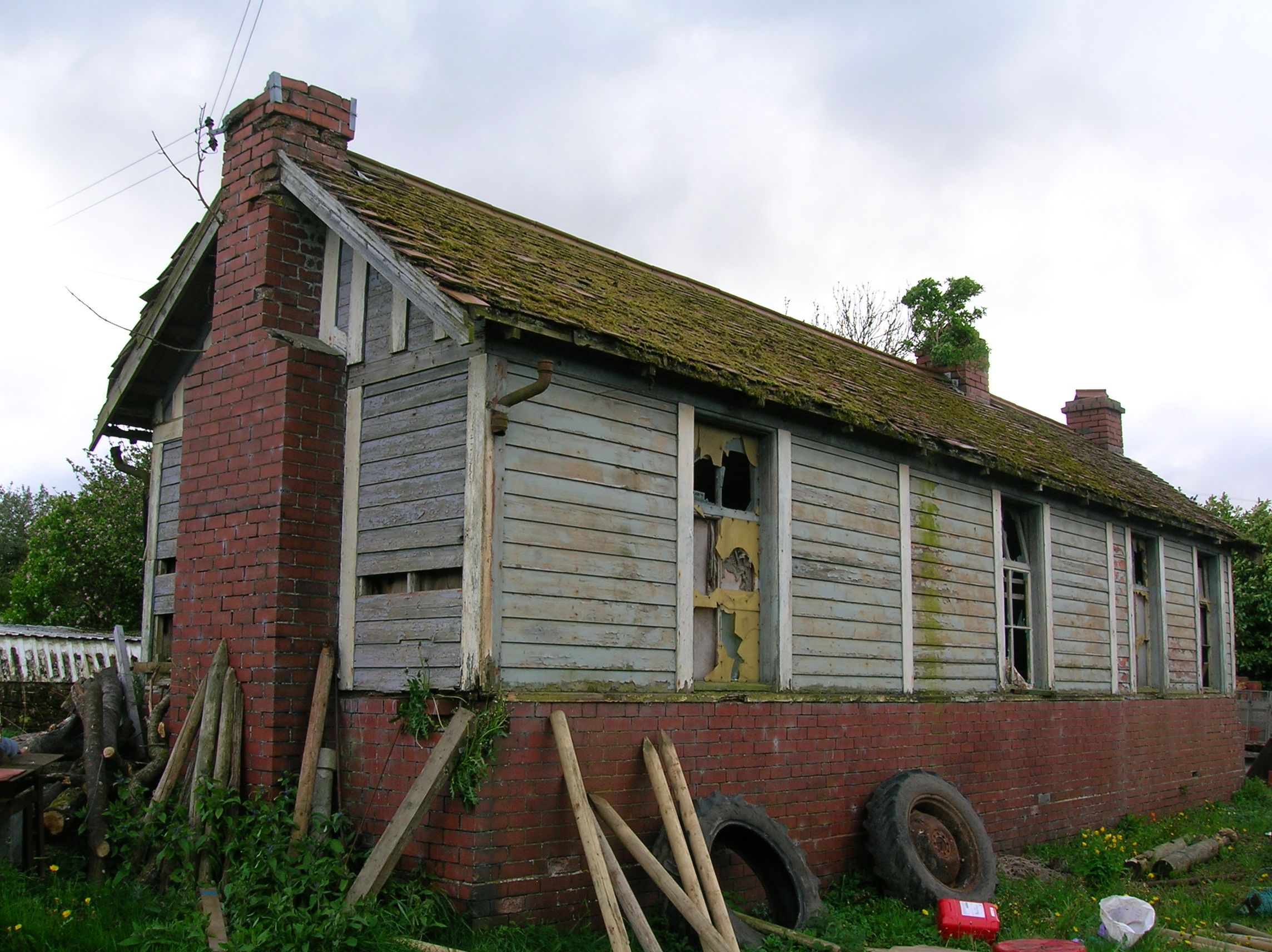
Far side of the station building

== See also ==
- List of closed railway stations in Britain

Preceding station	Historical railways	Following station
Kirkland	Glasgow and South Western Railway; Cairn Valley Light Railway	Terminus
