= Newtonairds railway station =

Former railway station in Scotland

Coordinates: 55.1026°N 3.7600°W

General information
- Location: Stepford, Dumfries and Galloway; Scotland

Other information
- Status: Disused

History
- Original company: Cairn Valley Railway
- Pre-grouping: Glasgow & South Western

Key dates
- 1 March 1905: Opened
- 3 May 1943: Closed to passengers
- 4 July 1949: Closed to freight
Location

Newtonairds (NX877801) was one of the principal stations on the now closed Cairn Valley Light Railway branch from Dumfries. It served a very rural area in Dumfries and Galloway.

== History ==
The CVR was nominally independent, but was in reality controlled by the Glasgow and South Western Railway. The line was closed to passengers on 3 May 1943, during WW2 and to freight on 4 July 1949, and the track lifted in 1953.

The station cost £212 to build in red brick with cream painted poster boards and chocolate-coloured framing. The extension over the front was covered with red tiles, as was the main roof. A booking office and waiting room was provided. A station master's house was provided.

The passing loop and signal box at Newtonairds remained even after the 'one engine in steam' method of working was introduced circa 1936.

Trains were controlled by a 'lock and block' system whereby the trains operated treadles on the single line to interact with the block instruments.

== See also ==
- List of closed railway stations in Britain

Preceding station	Historical railways	Following station
Irongray	Glasgow and South Western Railway; Cairn Valley Railway	Stepford
