= Cairn Water =

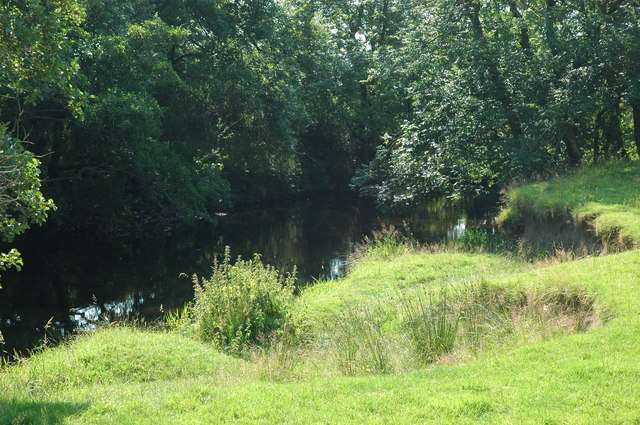
- Bank of Cairn Water near Crossford

Location
- Country: Scotland

Physical characteristics
- Source
  - location: Moniaive
- Mouth
  - coordinates: 55.08586°N 3.616819°W
- Length: 11.5 mi (18.5 km)

Basin features
- River system: River Nith
- Tributaries
  - left: Dalwhat Water, Old Water
  - right: Castlefairn Water

Cairn Water is a small river in Dumfries and Galloway, Scotland. The river, formed by the confluence of the Castlefern, Craigdarroch and Dalquhat, flows for 11.5 miles (18.5 km) southeast to the Cluden.

The Castlefairn is joined by the Craigdarroch and then by the Dalwhat, both from its left, just below the village of Moniaive in the parish of Glencairn. The confluence of these streams forms the Cairn Water. The parish is named for the river valley. The river flows east past Kirkland, then southeast to Newtonairds, where it is joined by the Old Water to form Cluden Water. Cluden Water flows east and southeast to join the River Nith just north of Dumfries. The entire stretch of river from Moniaive to the Nith is known locally as the River Cairn. The river once defined part of the boundary between Dumfriesshire to the east and Kirkcudbrightshire to the west.

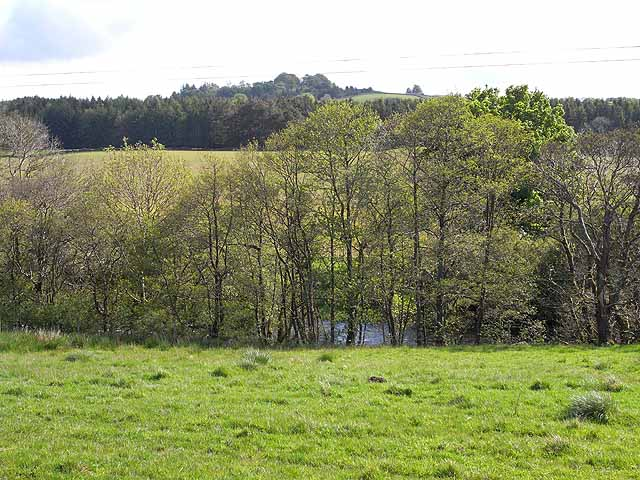
River flanked by trees on either bank

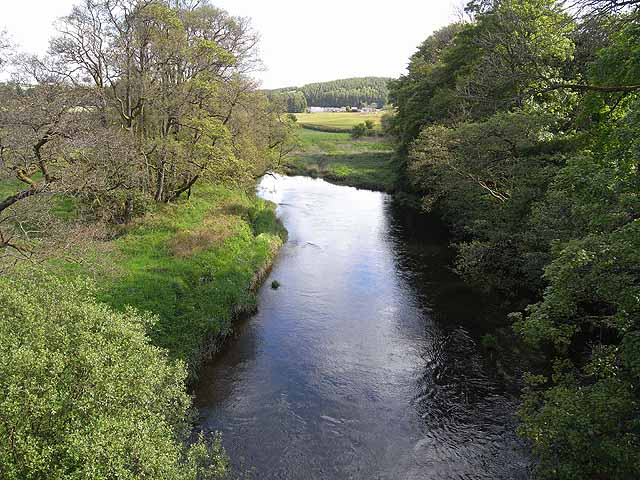
Looking upstream from Dalgonar Bridge

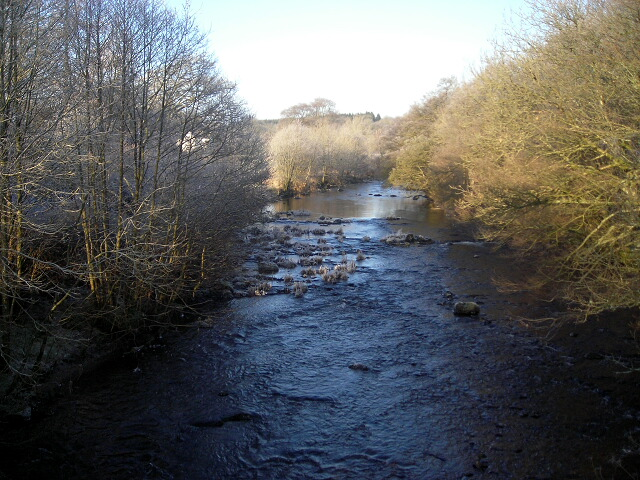
Near Stepford
