= John Inglis (missionary) =

Scottish missionary (1808–1891)

- Born: 14 July 1808; Moniaive, Dumfriesshire, Scotland
- Died: 18 July 1891 (aged 83)
- Occupation: missionary to the New Hebrides
- Known for: dictionary of the Aneiteum language

John Inglis (14 July 1808 – 18 July 1891) was a Scottish missionary to the New Hebrides (now known as Vanuatu). He served as Moderator to the Reformed Presbyterian Synod in 1861.

== Life ==
He was born in Moniaive, Dumfriesshire, Scotland on 14 July 1808. His father died while he was young. He initially trained as a stonemason, probably his father's profession.

He studied at the University of Glasgow, and at the Reformed Presbyterian College in Glasgow. At the latter his tutors included Rev Prof Daniel Sandford who employed Inglis to tutor his children. In the 1830s he ran a small school in Rothesay.

He was ordained a minister in the Reformed Presbyterian Church in 1843. He served as a missionary to the Maoris in New Zealand from 1842 to 1852, based at Manawatu and moved to the remote island of Aneityum in the New Hebrides from 1852 until 1876 when he resigned.

Inglis wrote a dictionary of the Aneiteum language, as well as In The New Hebrides: Reminiscences of Missionary Life And Work, Especially on the Island of Aneityum, From 1850 Till 1877.

J. Graham Miller describes Inglis as a man of "superior gifts, wise words and judicious pen."

In 1883 Glasgow University awarded him an honorary Doctor of Divinity (DD).

He died aged 84 at Kirkcowan, Dumfriesshire, close to his birthplace, on 18 July 1891.

== Family ==
In 1844 he married Jessie McClymont.
