= Glencairn, Dumfries and Galloway =

Coordinates: 55°11′37.3″N 3°52′18.6″W

Glencairn Parish Church
- Glencairn Kirk
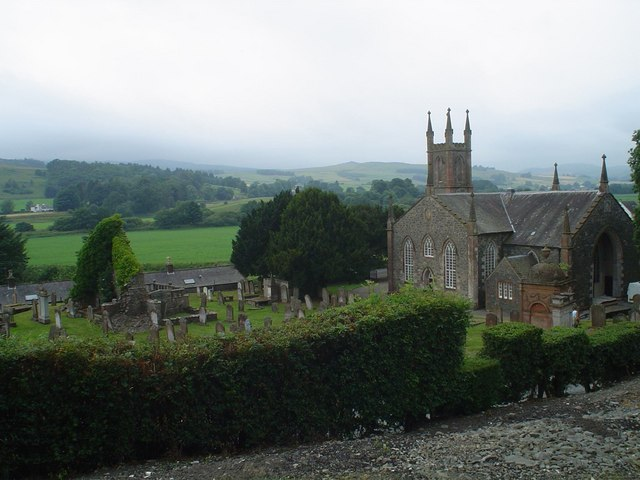
- Glencairn Parish Church
- Country: Scotland
- Denomination: Church of Scotland
- Website: glencairnparish.co.uk

History
- Status: Active
- Founded: 12th century
- Dedication: Cuthbert

Architecture
- Functional status: Parish Church
- Heritage designation: Category A
- Designated: 3 August 1971
- Architect: William McCandlish
- Style: Gothic Revival
- Years built: 1836
- Construction cost: £2000

Glencairn is an ecclesiastical and civil parish in Dumfries and Galloway, Scotland.

== Location ==
According to John Bartholomew's 1887 Gazetteer of the British Isles, the parish in west Dumfriesshire covered 30,083 acres (12,174 ha). The parish included the village of Moniaive, and lay 8 miles (13 km) southwest of Thornhill station. In 1887 the parish had a population of 1,737. As of 2011, the community council, including the villages of Kirkland and Moniaive, had a population of about 945.

The community council stretches along the valley formed by Dalwhat Water and then the Cairn Water. Moniaive is surrounded by hills, and lies at the point where the Dalwhat Water, Craigdarroch Water and Castlefairn Water converge to form the Cairn Water, which flows down the Cairn Valley to join the River Nith just north of Dumfries.

The small amount of flat land in the council area is vulnerable to flooding.

== History ==
The Cunninghams assumed the title of Earl of Glencairn from the parish. Glencairn Castle in Moniaive, now called Maxwelton House, dates back to 1370. First owned by the Dennistouns, it was passed by marriage to Clan Cunningham whose chiefs became the Earls of Glencairn in 1488. In 1611 the castle was sold to the Laurie family. Annie Laurie, subject of an old Scottish poem, was born in the castle in 1682. The original tower house has been much extended and modernized, and is now more of a mansion than a castle. The house has been restored and is now a private residence.

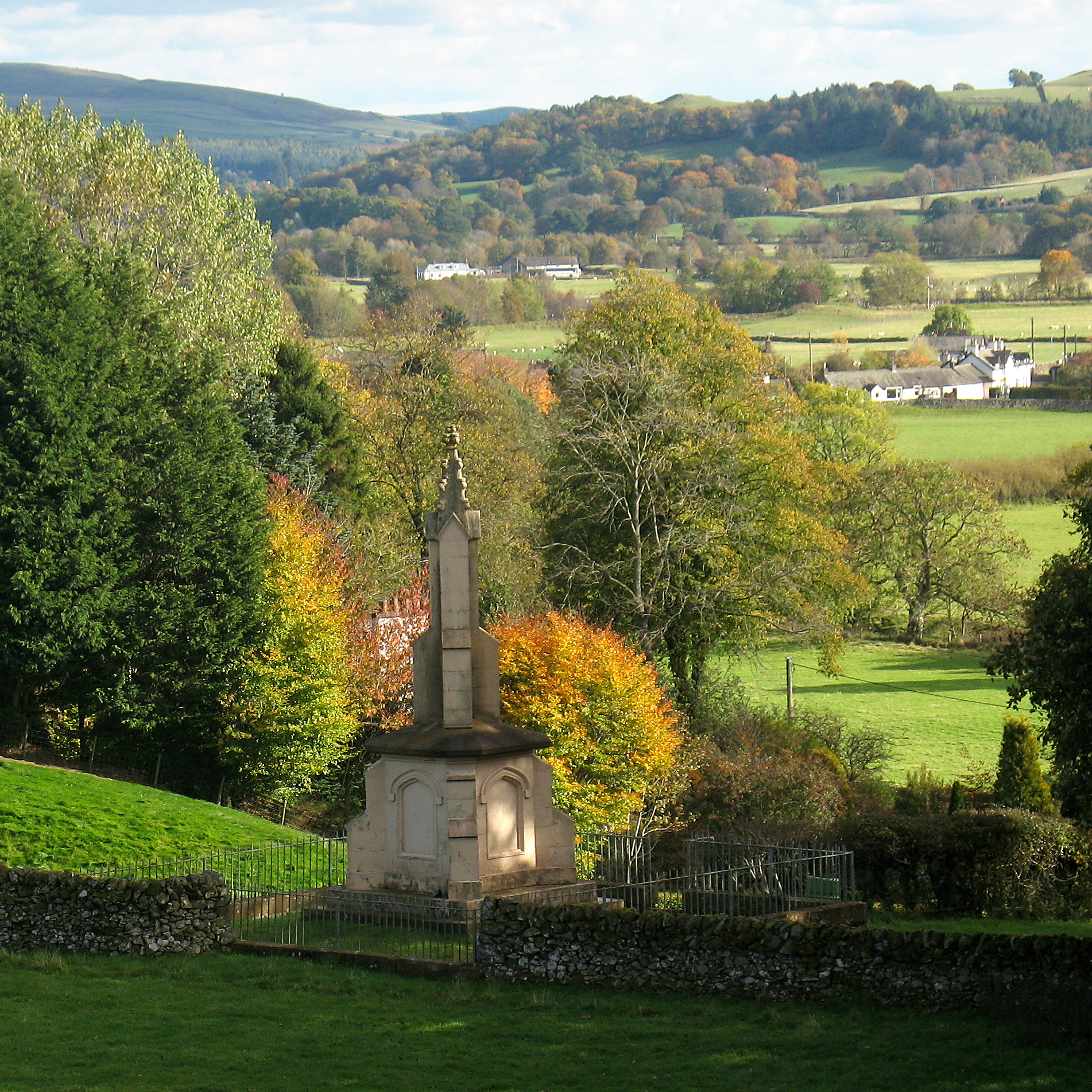
View of the Covenanter Monument in Moniaive Dumfriesshire to the Reverend James Renwick "born near this spot 15th February 1662 and executed at the Grassmarket Edinburgh 17th February 1688" with the Cairn Valley beyond.

James Renwick (15 February 1662 – 17 February 1688) was born in Moniaive, son of a weaver. He became a Scottish minister, and was the last of the Covenanter martyrs. After the covenanter John Blackadder had been expelled from his parish at Troqueer, near Dumfries, in 1662 he moved to Caitloch in Glencairn parish, where he sometimes preached to large assemblies. When the authorities heard about his activities, he was forced to move again, and began a wandering life.

The Glencairn Parish Church became a Category A listed building on 3 August 1971. The Gothic-style church was built in 1836 to a design by architect William MacCandlish of Dalry. The transept has unusual arrangement of a large arched opening with the north window and 3 doors recessed on the north wall. There is a white marble monument to Walter Ross Munro (d. 1816) on the east wall. The church contains a bronze bust of the Rev Patrick Borrowman by James Paterson (1900).
