= Moniaive =

Village in Dumfries and Galloway, Scotland

Coordinates: 55.197°N 3.921°W

Moniaive: Scottish Gaelic: Am Moine Naomh; Scots: Minnyhive
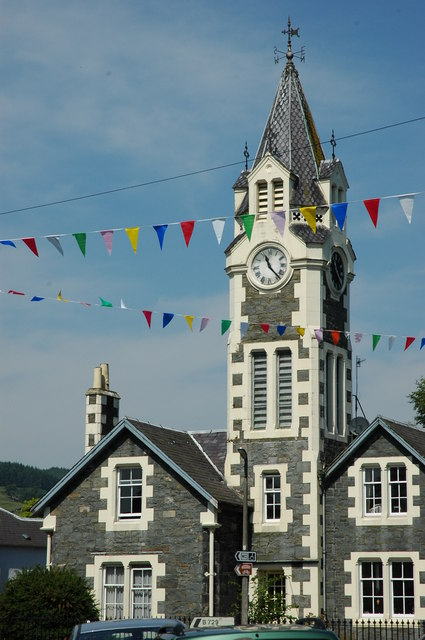
- The Clock Tower, Moniaive

- Location within Dumfries and Galloway
- Population: 520
- OS grid reference: NX778909
- Council area: Dumfries and Galloway
- Lieutenancy area: Dumfries
- Country: Scotland
- Sovereign state: United Kingdom
- Post town: THORNHILL
- Postcode district: DG3
- Dialling code: 01848
- Police: Scotland
- Fire: Scottish
- Ambulance: Scottish
- UK Parliament: Dumfries and Galloway
- Scottish Parliament: Dumfriesshire

Moniaive (/mɒniˈaɪv/ 'monny-IVE'; Scottish Gaelic: Am Moine Naomh, "The Holy Moor") is a village in the Parish of Glencairn, in Dumfries and Galloway, southwest Scotland. It stands on the Cairn and Dalwhat Waters, 16 miles (26 km) north-west of the town of Dumfries. Moniaive has been named best overall small village in the Nithsdale in Bloom competition five times in a row, from 2006 to 2011. The village streetscape was featured in the 2002 Peter Mullan film The Magdalene Sisters. In 2004, The Times described the village as one of the 'coolest' in Britain.

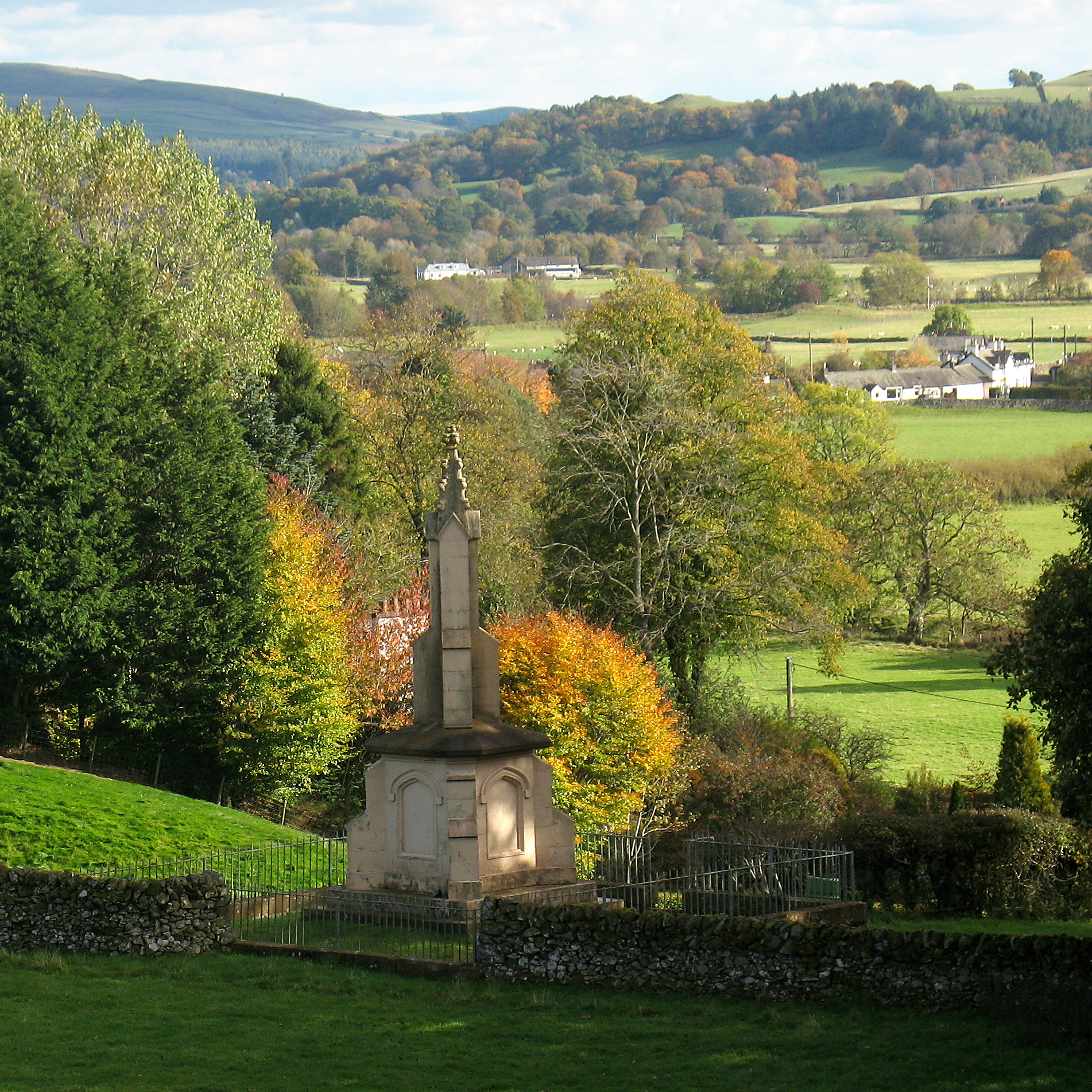
View of the Renwick Monument, Moniaive

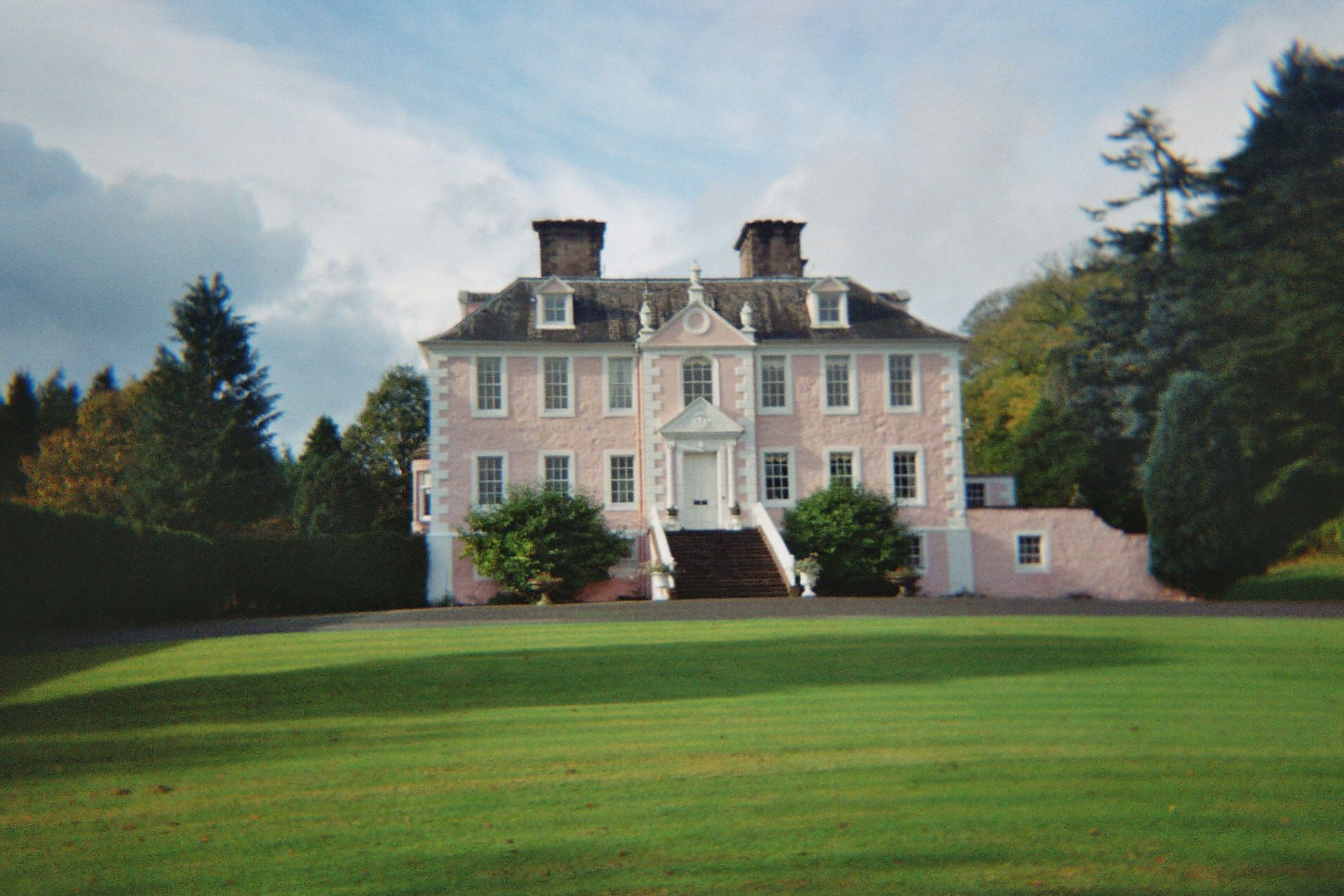
Craigdarroch by William Adam (1729), home of Annie Laurie

== History ==
Moniaive has existed as a village as far back as the 10th century. On 4 July 1636 King Charles I granted a charter in favour of William, Earl of Dumfries, making Moniaive a 'free Burgh of Barony'. With this charter came the rights to set up a market cross and tolbooth, to hold a weekly market on Tuesday and two annual fairs each of three days duration. Midsummer Fair was from 16 June and Michaelmas Fair on the last day of September.

=== Covenanting ===
In the 17th century, Moniaive became the refuge for the Covenanters, a group of Presbyterian nonconformists who rebelled at having the Episcopalian religion forced on them by the last three Stuart kings, Charles I, Charles II and James VII. There is a monument off the Ayr Road to James Renwick, a Covenanter leader born in Moniaive, and who aged 26 was the last Covenanter to be executed in Edinburgh.

=== James Paterson ===
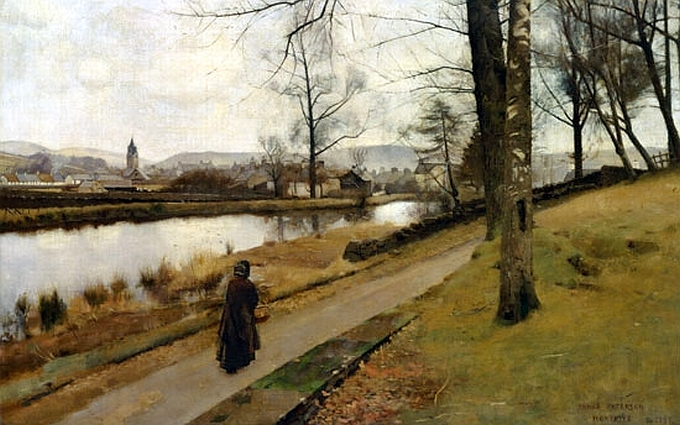
"The Last Turning", James Paterson (1885)

The Scottish artist James Paterson, a founder member of 'The Glasgow Boys', settled in Moniaive in 1884 and stayed for 22 years. He painted many local scenes including "The Last Turning" – a view of a woman approaching the village on the lane on the western side of the old millpond (now drained) in the Dalwhat Valley – now displayed in the Kelvingrove Art Gallery and Museum. A James Paterson museum existed within the village until 2005 displaying photographs and memorabilia from the collection of his granddaughter, Anne Paterson-Wallace.

=== Cairn Valley Light Railway ===
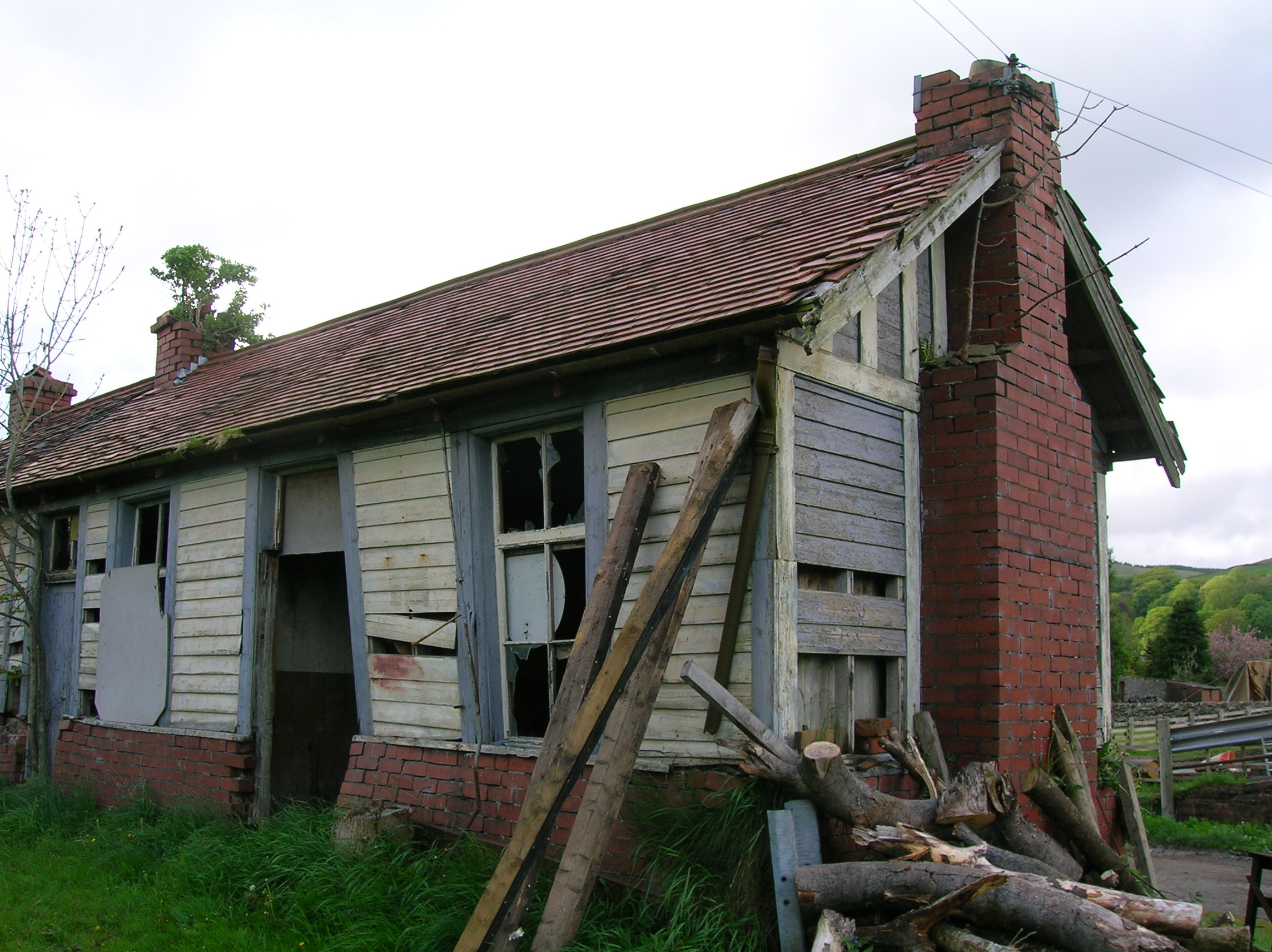
Moniaive station in 2009

The Cairn Valley Light Railway was opened from Dumfries in 1905 as a subsidiary company of the Glasgow and South Western Railway. Plans initially had involved developing Moniaive into a resort due to the countryside being very scenic and peaceful. Passenger services were suspended as a wartime economy on 3 May 1943 and to all traffic on 4 August 1947.

== Local economy ==
The local economy is dominated by sheep and some cattle farming as well as forestry. The area has a large self-employed community including writers, artists, graphic designers, historical interpretation services, clothing designers, aromatherapists, stained glass workers, a wine importing business, a chocolatier, computer repairs, garden and landscaping services, plant nursery, and child care. There is a large general store including a post office counter, a garage, a cafe, a chocolatier, an Italian restaurant, several artist studios, a primary school, a guest house and two hotels with bars and restaurants, one with accommodation, and two village halls.

A bi-monthly newspaper, called the Glencairn Gazette, is produced by volunteers and distributed free to residents.

== Notable people ==
- Michael Chaplin, the son of Charlie Chaplin, eloped to and married in Moniaive as a teenager
- Rumer Godden, writer, lived in Moniaive
- Alex Kapranos of rock band Franz Ferdinand bought the house in Moniaive previously owned by James Paterson
- Alan Grant, writer of Judge Dredd and Batman
- John Inglis (missionary)
- Joanna Lumley also has a home near here
- Rab Smith, ex-professional darts player

== Festivals ==
In 2015 Moniaive reinvented itself as Moniaive Festival Village and went on to win a Creative Place Award from Creative Scotland. The village is home to a number of festivals that are held every year including; the Moniaive Folk Festival, the Moniaive Michaelmas Bluegrass Festival, Moniaive Comic Festival, the Scottish Autoharp Weekend, the Moniaive Horse Show, the Moniaive and District Arts Association annual exhibition, the Glencairn and Tynron Horticultural Society show and the Moniaive Gala. In 2016 the Moniaive Comic Book Festival was resurrected as part of the Creative Place award programme, it successfully held its second comic festival in 2017.

== Cairnhead Community Forest and Striding Arches ==
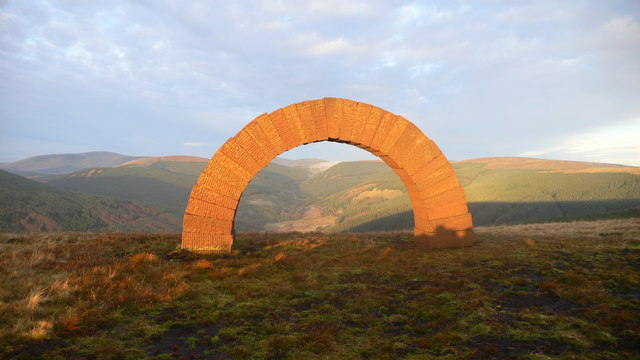
Bail Hill Striding Arch, by Andy Goldsworthy

Cairnhead Community Forest is a Scottish charity formed in 1998 to encourage and enable community participation through a working partnership with its owner Forestry and Land Scotland. There are four arches by artist Andy Goldsworthy in the area; the first is built into the byre at Cairnhead while three more can be found on Bail Hill, Benbrack and Colt Hill. Each arch stands just under four metres high, with a span of about seven metres, and consists of 31 blocks of hand-dressed red sandstone weighing about 27 tonnes.

== The GeoDial and John Corrie Wildlife Garden ==
In 2009 a GeoDial was commissioned by the Geological Society of Dumfries and Galloway for the people of Moniaive to celebrate the geodiversity of the area. It stands next to the Dalwhat water in the John Corrie Wildlife Garden and riverside walk. The GeoDial has an interpretation board that identifies the rock types of the GeoDial and of the rocks that make up the stone circle that surrounds it.

== Gallery ==
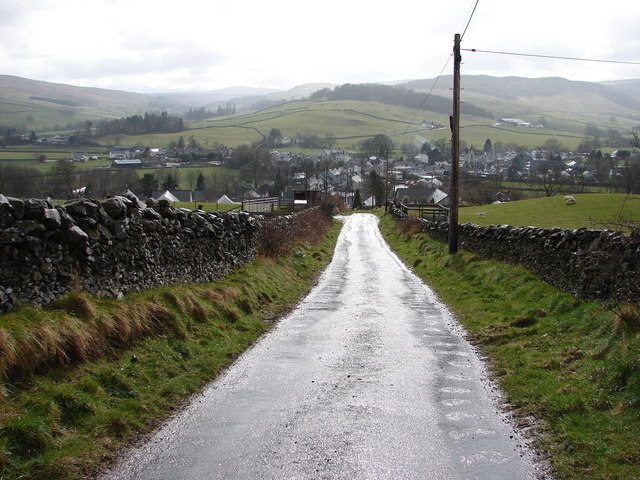
Dunreggan Brae, Moniaive

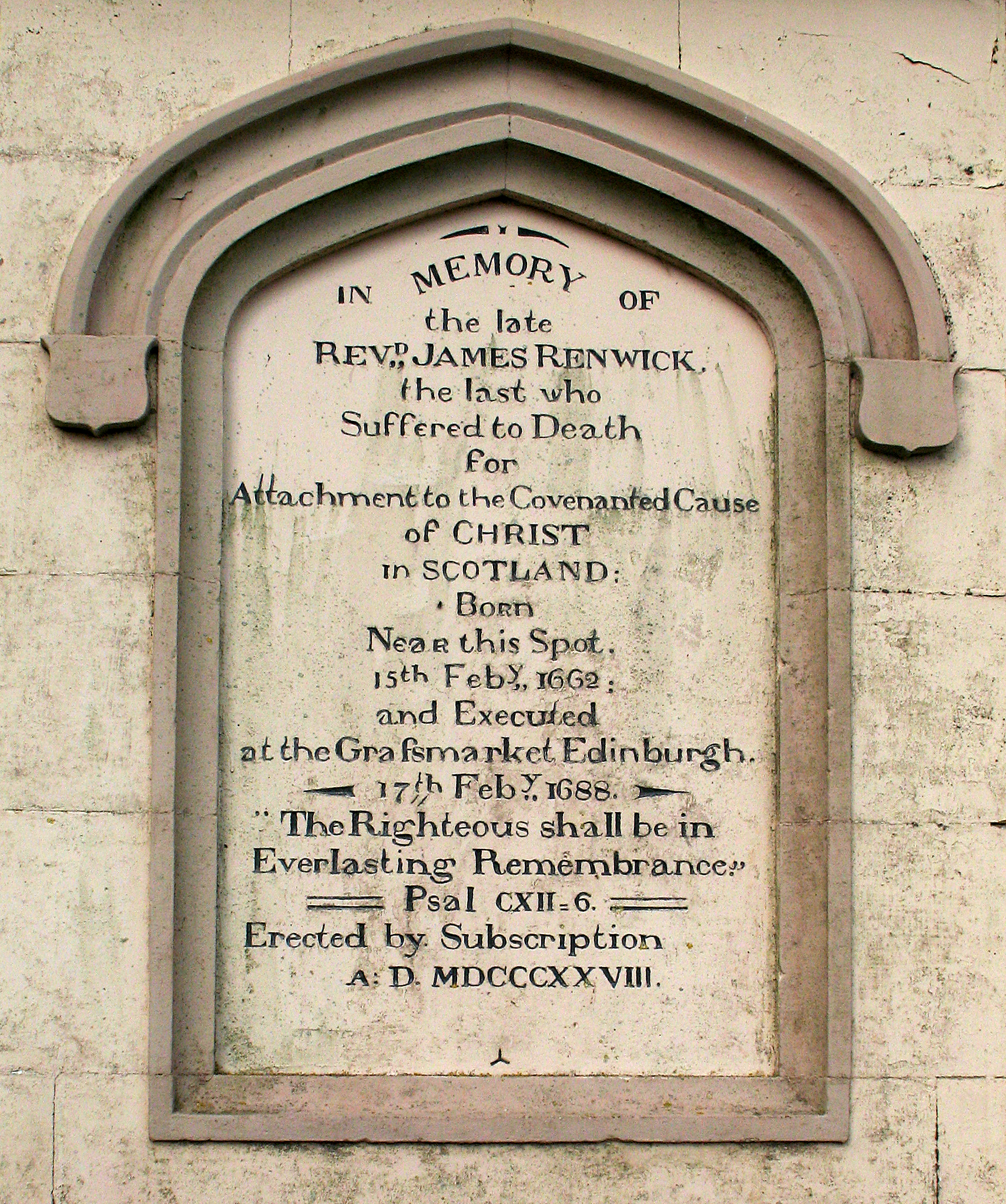
Inscription on the Renwick Monument

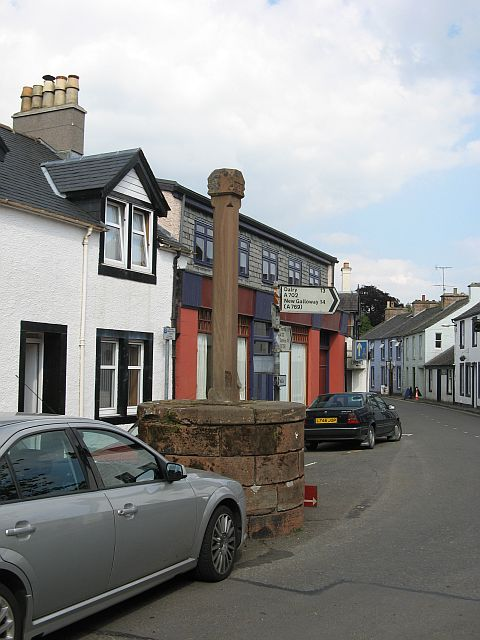
Moniaive, mercat cross

== See also ==
- Ley tunnel - Covenanter's escape tunnel
- William West Neve - Architect
- Cademuir International School
