= Crossford railway station =

Former railway station in Scotland

Coordinates: 55.1744°N 3.8332°W

Crossford

General information
- Location: Crossford, Dumfries and Galloway; Scotland

Other information
- Status: Disused

History
- Original company: Cairn Valley Light Railway
- Pre-grouping: Glasgow and South Western Railway
- Post-grouping: London, Midland and Scottish Railway

Key dates
- 1 March 1905: Station opened
- 3 May 1943: Station closed
Location

Crossford is a closed station of the Cairn Valley Light Railway branch, from Dumfries. It served the rural area of Crossford in Dumfries and Galloway The line was closed to passengers in 1943.

== History ==
The CVR was nominally independent, but was in reality controlled by the Glasgow and South Western Railway. The line was closed to passengers on 3 May 1943, during WW2 and to freight on 4 July 1949, and the track lifted in 1953. 1947 is also quoted as a date of complete closure.

The siding was worked by down trains only, goods for Dumfries being taken to the nearest station along. The points were unlocked with an Annett's key that was kept in a locked box on a post adjacent to the point.

Trains were controlled by a 'lock and block' system whereby the trains operated treadles on the single line to interact with the block instruments.

== Views at the old station ==
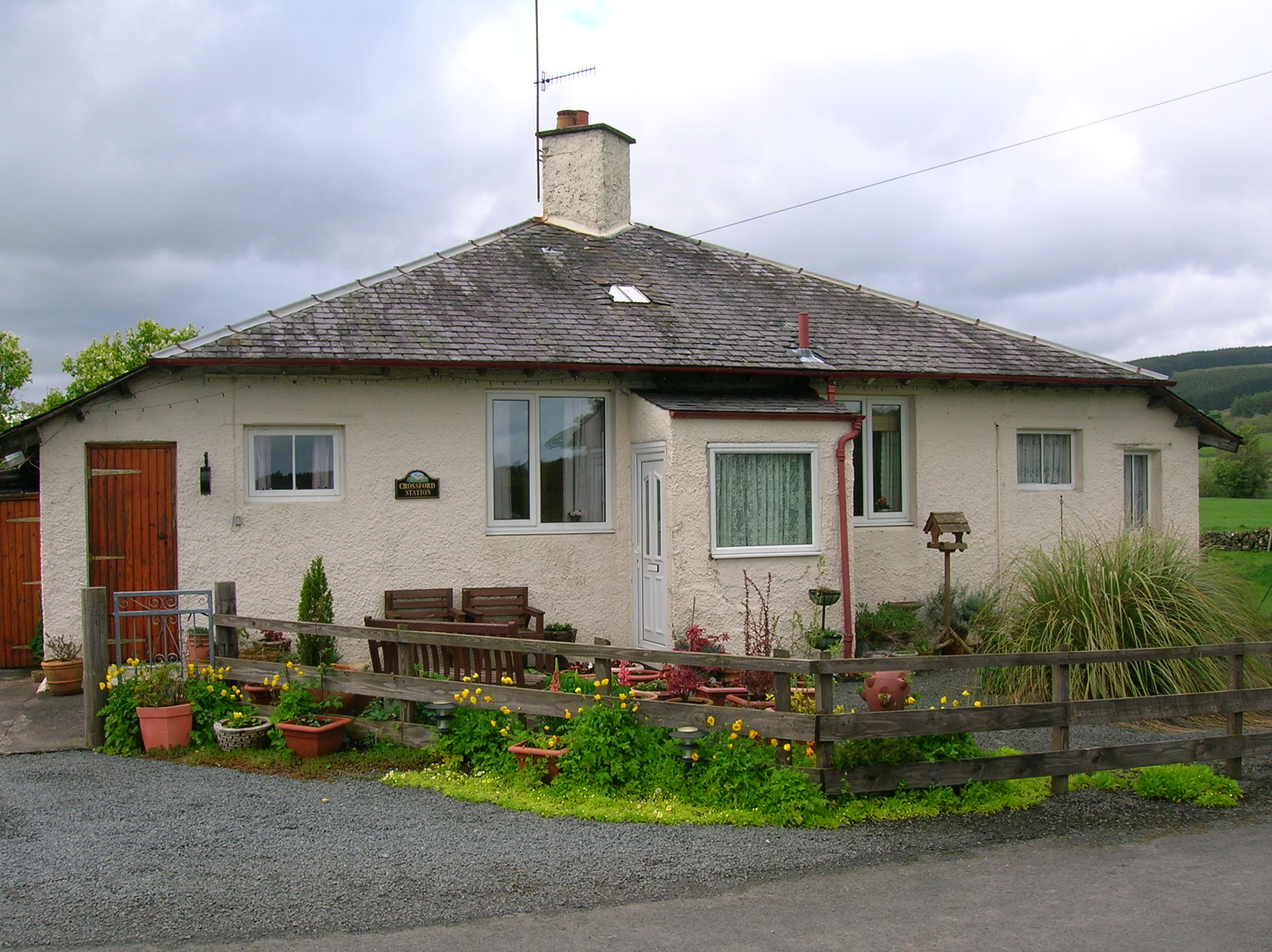
Crossford's old station master's house.

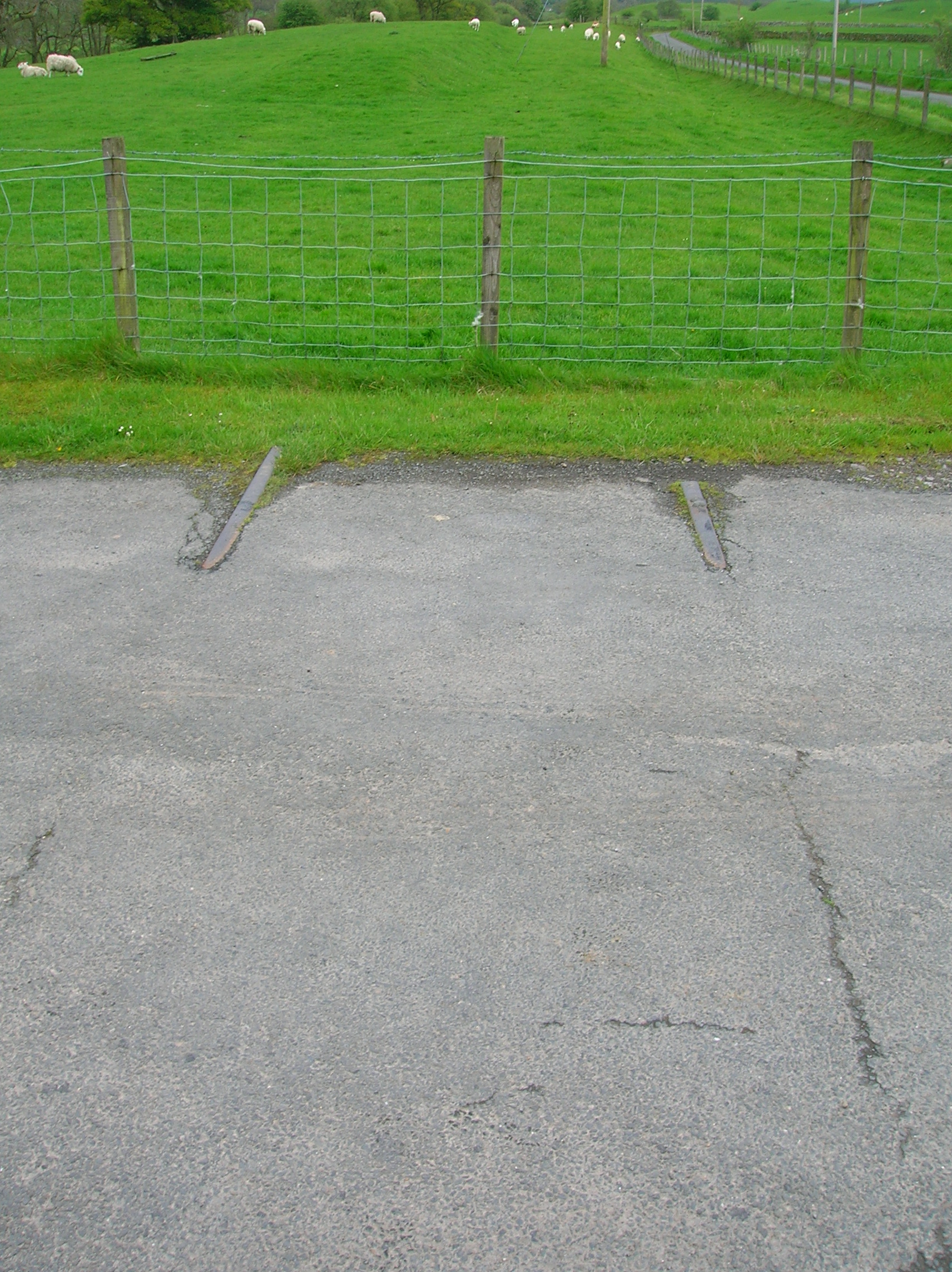
Rails still in the road at the level crossing.

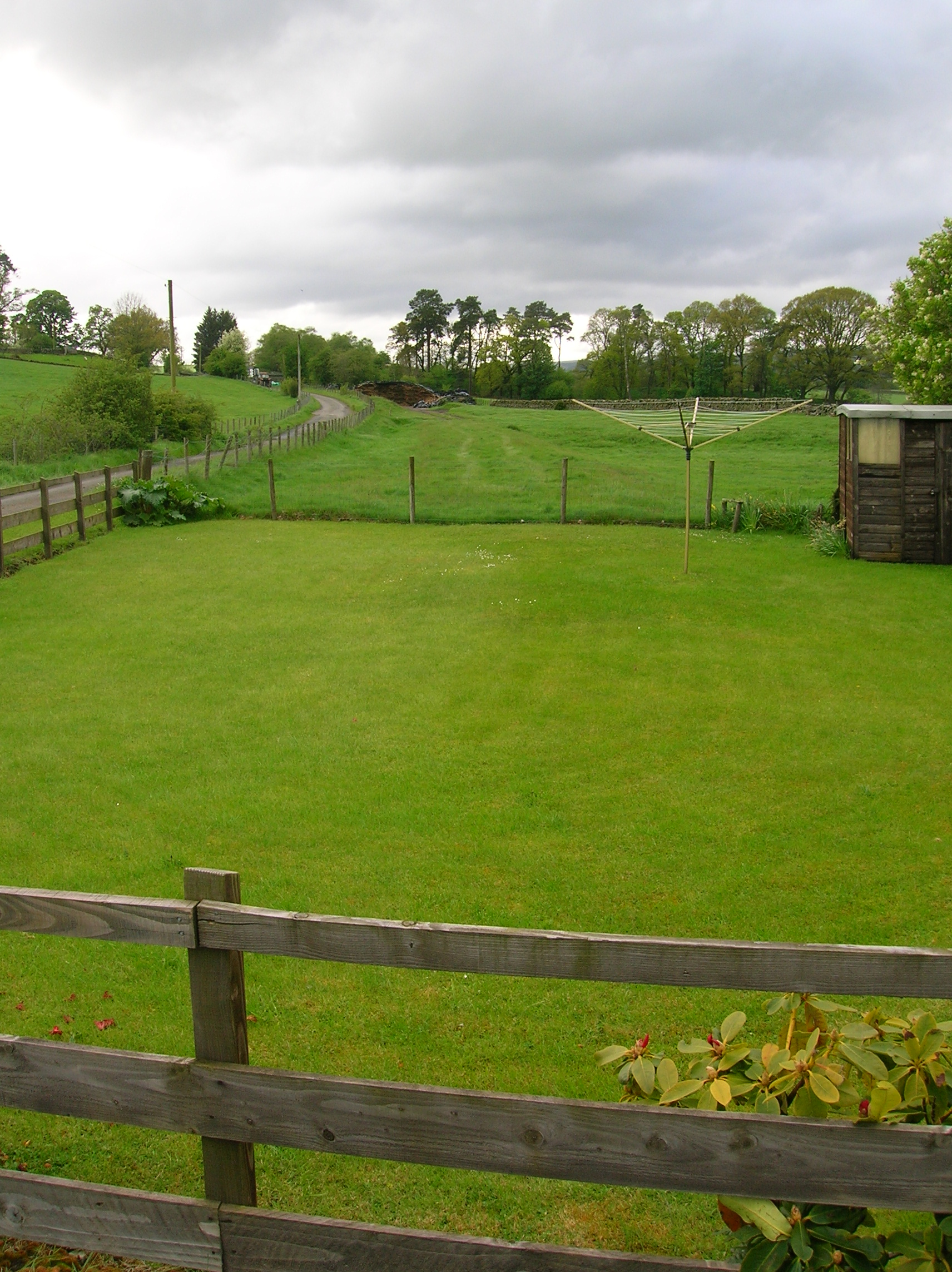
The course of the trackbed running towards Moniaive.

== See also ==
- List of closed railway stations in Britain

Preceding station	Historical railways	Following station
Dunscore	Glasgow and South Western Railway; Cairn Valley Railway	Kirkland
