= Rood Adeo =

Dutch musician

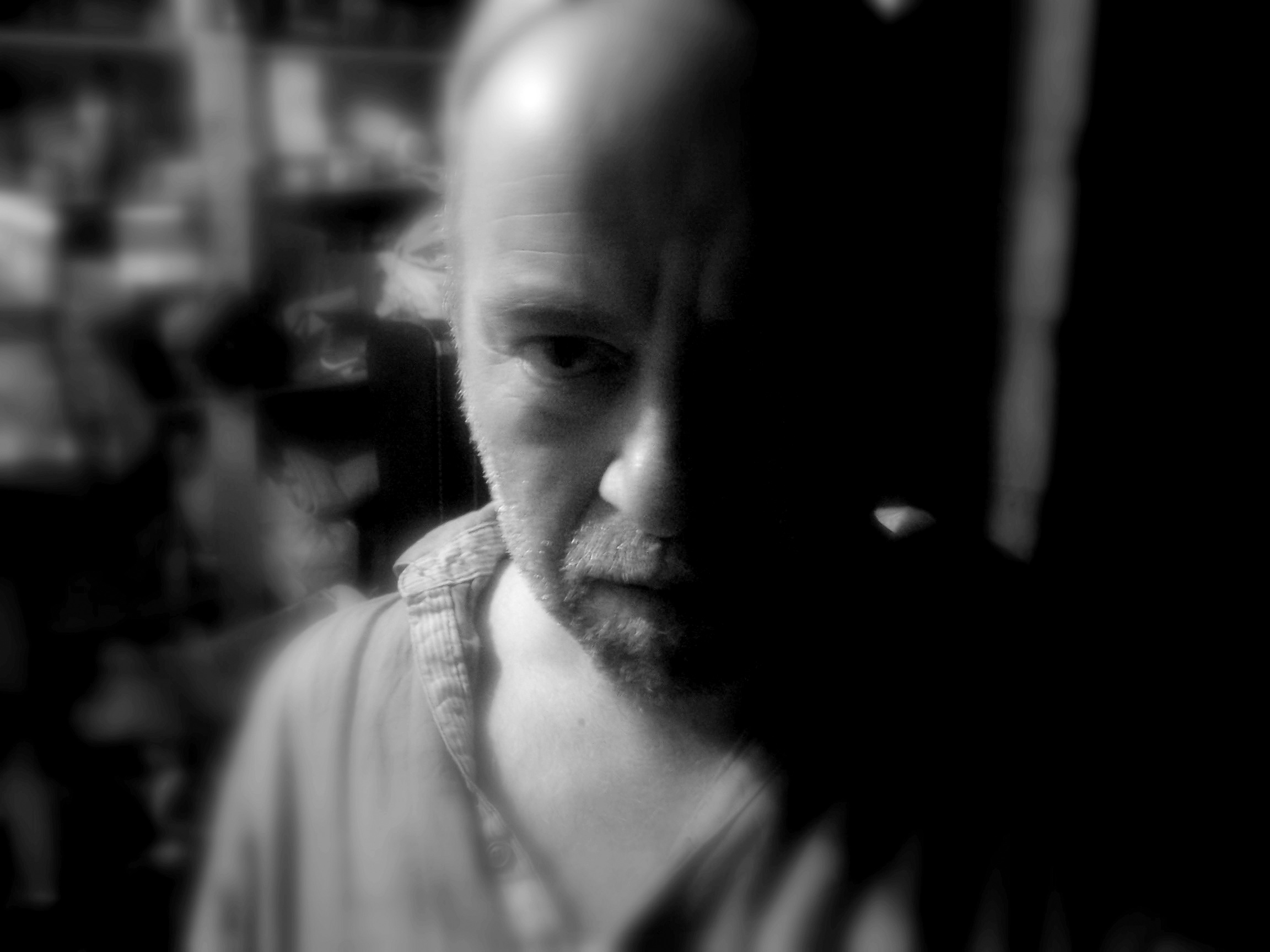
- Rood Adeo, Hilversum, March 2012

Background information
- Born: Roderik Adeo Jansz; 10 November 1970 (age 55); Nijmegen, The Netherlands
- Genres: rock, jazz, folk, blues
- Occupations: Musician, singer, songwriter
- Instruments: Vocals, percussion, piano, keyboards, guitar, bass guitar
- Years active: 1996–present
- Labels: Polygram, Sony, EMI, Challenge Records International

Rood Adeo (born Roderik Adeo Jansz, 10 November 1970, in Nijmegen) is a Dutch singer-songwriter, multi-instrumentalist, and recording artist. His musical style is influenced by rock, jazz, blues, classical, and folk. Adeo's flexible voice, ranging from tenor to bass, varies between a bright, high pitched sound and a duskier, harsh timbre. Founder of the band Rood & Nighthawks at the Diner, Adeo also recorded a number of albums under different names, backed by a changing line-up of musicians. Adeo performs with piano, guitar, and with the occasionally use of other keyboards, accordion, and cajón.

== Early life ==
Rood Adeo was educated at Canisius College Mater Dei, and Radboud University Nijmegen. For eight years during and afterwards his study, he co-owned a stage bar in his hometown with a view to practice in psychology, but the release of his first album Fool's Tango (1997) won him over to songwriting and performing. Something of his psychology framework resonates in his lyrics, for example in the song "Paradise To Me". At the age of five, Adeo began his classical piano training, which is reflected in songs such as "King in Yellow" (based on Pachelbel's Canon) and "To Be A Man" (opening with the postlude of Chopin's Nocturne in B major, Op. 32, No. 1). Though Adeo often mentions his affinity for the works of Ludwig van Beethoven, Nat King Cole, Frank Sinatra, Nina Simone, and J.J. Cale, he presumably has been influenced the most by the music of Tom Waits and Robert Wyatt. As an hommage to Waits, Adeo debuts on stage at the 1995 edition of the Midsummer Blues Festival Wijchen as frontman of his band 'Nighthawks at the Diner', referring to Waits' 1975 live album.

== 1990's ==
On record, Rood Adeo debuts with his Nighthawks at the Diner-album Fool's Tango in 1997, introducing co-composers Frank de Kleer and Bob Wisselink. Fool's Tango is rewarded 'demo of the month' in MusicMaker, the foremost musicians' magazine in The Netherlands. The album draws the attention of jazz-bassist and A&R executive Hein van de Geyn, who paves the way to its release on the jazz-label Challenge Records International.Fool's Tango also features Fay Lovsky singing a duet with Adeo on "You Invented Me". In 1998, Adeo is being asked by Sony/Philips to record with the newly developed digital recording system Super Audio CD. This project results in his second Nighthawks at the Diner-album Walkin' On Eggs, published bij Challenge/Polygram. In August 1998, Adeo's Nighthawks at the Diner wins the Public and Press Award at the Sopot International Song Festival in Poland. In 1999, the single How About The Next Millennium is being released and Walkin' On Eggs again presented at the Funkausstellung in Berlin. Adeo's ballad "To Be A Man" is released on the Polish Wroclaw Theatre Festival jubilee album Kronika XX Przegladu Piosenki Aktorskiej by Luna Music with amongst others, Nick Cave and Cesaria Evora. Concerts at the Baltic Song Contest, Sweden and the Wrocław International Theatre Festival, Poland follow shortly after. At this time, Adeo's songs are being described as 'the range between Chopin and a film noir-soundtrack'.

== 2000's ==
In 2000, Adeo records Rood & Emanuel: Retrato, a Portuguese nontraditional fado-album, in collaboration with fado-singer Emanuel Pessanha. For the Weill-edition of the Theatre Festival 2000 in Wroclaw, Rood & Nighthawks at the Diner arrange four Kurt Weill songs. Rood Adeo's versions of "I'm a Stranger Here Myself" and "Lost in the Stars" appear on his albums Transit Cellophane and Perfect Life. In 2002, Adeo's third Nighthawks at the Diner-album Transit Cellophane was released on the label NWR published by NWR/EMI . In August 2005, he performs in Denmark and records Jessie Mae Robinson's "The Other Woman" for the Nina Simone tribute album Greetings From Nijmegen, on which he also accompanies Dutch Idols finalist Maud Mulder on "Everything Must Change". Adeo's live performances are critically acclaimed, with reviews emphasising on Adeo's timing and expressive, dynamic piano play. Though Adeo refers to his lyrics as being non-political, he withdrew his contributions as a school music teacher in 2010, when the Dutch populist politician Geert Wilders actively participated in the Dutch minority cabinet 2010–2012, stating: 'I don't want to receive payments from the Department of Education, as long as it’s being run by individuals behaving like CEO's of an absurd, onworthy [sic] political hedge fund.' After the dismantling of the cabinet Adeo resumed his teaching career. In March 2006, Rood & Nighthawks at the Diner close down the Night of Poetry Festival at Vredenburg Concert Hall Utrecht. "Observant Spectator" is being released on the DVD Dichters in Woord en Beeld (Poets in Word and Frame). In May 2006, Adeo composes the music for Frank Boeijen's song "Verloren Stad" (Lost City), which is being released on the DVD As. In Greece, his song "The Waltzes, The Polkas, And The Sad Songs" is being released on the 2008 album Muzine Three Red & White Mood. In 2009, Adeo records the ROOD & Nighthawks at the Diner-album Perfect Life in collaboration with producer Loek Schrievers. Perfect Life also features bariton Ernst Daniël Smid singing a duet with Adeo on "Baby Don't You Like My New Tattoo".

== 2010's ==
In 2012, Mindful Indifference is being released on the label Supertracks/Challenge Records International. On this album, Adeo started experimenting as sound-engineer, producing and recording his songs single-miced, playing most of the instruments himself. Music magazine Oor considers the album “an important milestone in the interesting music firmament”. In March 2018, Rood Adeo switches to the record label Kroese Records, who releases Voluntary Intakes in October 2018. The album, first of a diptych, comprises seventeen tracks and contains previous, new and live recordings. According to Adeo, the title alludes to the desired character of assumptions. As he explains in a 2018 interview: “Every intake, every assumption, should be voluntary. Our way of life has become a labyrinth of involuntary assumptions, built on the dung hill of older unconscious assumptions. The believes in a God, legal systems, universal human rights: they’re all assumptions. Voluntary or involuntary, it’s all fiction. If we want to pursue mental or spiritual freedom, we have to start chucking assumptions overboard.” The second album of the diptych, Worn Love, is released in 2021.

== Discography ==
=== Albums ===
- Fool's Tango (1997)
- Walkin' On Eggs (1998)
- Walkin' On Eggs – SACD (1999)
- How About The Next Millennium (1999/2000)
- Rood & Emanuel: Retrato (2000)
- Transit Cellophane (2002)
- Perfect Life (2009)
- Mindful Indifference (2012)
- Voluntary Intakes (2018)
- Worn Love (2021)

=== Other albums ===
- Kronika XX Przegladu Piosenki Aktorskiej, 'To Be A Man', Poland (1999)
- Greetings From Nijmegen, 'The Other Woman' (2005)
- Dichters In Woord En Beeld DVD, 'Observant Spectator' (2006)
- As, with Frank Boeijen, 'Verloren Stad' (2006)
- De Ontmoeting, 'Heaven and Hell' (2008)
- Muzine 03 White Mood, 'The Waltzes, The Polkas, And The Sad Songs', Greece (2008)

=== Compilations ===
- The Beauty Of It All (2010)

=== Other contributions ===
- Piano and vocals on Deborah Jean Weitzman's Beneath Your Moon (2002)
- Piano on 'Cidade Amor Saudade', with Quatro Ventos on Barco De Papel (2003)
- Piano on 'Everything Must Change', with Maud Mulder on Greetings From Nijmegen (2005)
