= Cairn Valley Light Railway =

Former railway line in Scotland

The Cairn Valley Light Railway was a rural railway line built to connect Moniaive and other communities in the Cairn Valley with the main railway network at Dumfries. It opened in 1905 but usage was disappointing, and declined further when bus companies started competing. It was closed to passengers in 1943, and completely closed in 1949.

== History ==
=== Early proposals ===
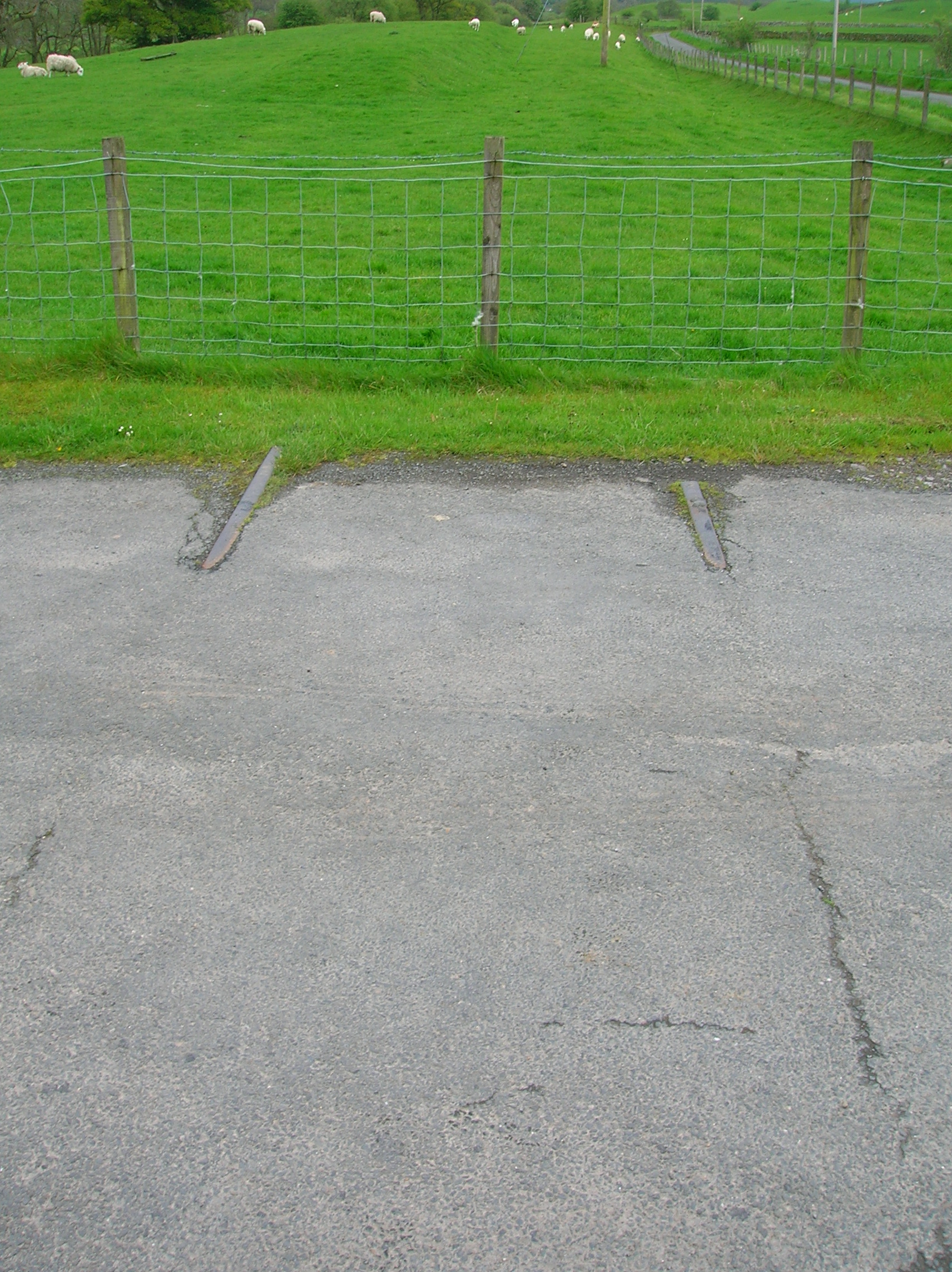
Rails at the old Crossford station

The Glasgow and South Western Railway (G&SWR) fully opened its main line between Glasgow and Carlisle via Dumfries in 1850, revolutionising transport facilities at the places served. Communities that were by-passed began to feel disadvantages of not having a railway connection.

Glencairn Railway Act 1872 (Note: Section 1.)
- Act of Parliament
- Parliament of the United Kingdom
- Long title: An Act for making a Railway from Moniaive, in the county of Dumfries, to a point near to the Auldgirth Station of the Glasgow and South-western Railway; and for other purposes.
- Citation: 35 & 36 Vict. c. clxxvi
- Territorial extent: United Kingdom

Dates
- Royal assent: 6 August 1872
- Commencement: 6 August 1872 (Note: The Acts of Parliament (Commencement) Act 1793.)
- Repealed: 27 June 1881
Other legislation
Repealed by	Glencairn Railway (Abandonment) Act 1881

Status: Repealed

Text of statute as originally enacted

As early as 1865 a branch railway to Moniaive was proposed: the G&SWR paid two-thirds of the cost of a survey. In 1867 a determined effort was made to start construction. The cost of a line connecting Moniaive to the G&SWR was estimated at £66,000, but local promoters only got commitment to £20,150 in subscriptions. They approached the G&SWR with a request to subscribe the difference, but the G&SWR took the view that any advantages would come to the inhabitants themselves, and it was for them to put up the money. The scheme came to nothing. A further scheme was proposed in 1872, the Glencairn Railway from Auldgirth to Moniaive; this scheme obtained an act of Parliament authorising it, the Glencairn Railway Act 1872 (35 & 36 Vict. c. clxxvi), but was unable to raise the needed capital. Another unsuccessful proposal followed in 1879.

In 1896 two proposed lines were put forward; they planned different routes. One would strike east following the valley of the Shinnel Water to connect with the G&SWR main line at Thornhill; this was the shortest path to the main line, but would involve challenging gradients. The second proposed to descend south-south-east with the Cairn Water and the Cluden Water to join the G&SWR a short distance north of Dumfries, near Holywood. While also having significant gradients this route would be more moderate, and involved easier civil engineering, and had the advantage of reaching close to the County Burgh.

=== A viable scheme ===
This time the G&SWR was persuaded of the advantage of having the railway constructed, and it adopted the Holywood scheme. The Glasgow and South Western Railway Act 1897 (60 & 61 Vict. c. clxxii) of 6 August 1897 authorised the construction (along with several other G&SWR proposals): the line was named the Cairn Valley Railway, and its estimated cost was £165,840.

The Light Railways Act 1896 (59 & 60 Vict. c. 48) had been enacted in order to permit the construction of local railways with some of the requirements for main line routes somewhat relaxed, to allow cheaper construction, and the G&SWR belatedly considered that the Cairn Valley line was well suited to the arrangement. Some changes to the route were suggested by them at this stage, but they were advised that the act authorising the line could not be varied without a further act of Parliament. Inaction followed until the board resolved to apply for a light railway order (LRO) for the originally determined route, on 4 October 1898; the budget was reduced to £123,857. The official process of approving the LRO was not swift, and the Glasgow and South-Western (Cairn Valley Light Railway) Order 1899 was finally ratified on 29 December 1899.

If the authorisation process had been slow, the construction was little better, and the permitted construction period expired on 6 August 1902; a provisional parliamentary order authorised an extension for two years, and this had to be repeated for a further extension on 1 August 1904. The contractor successfully claimed compensation for unforeseen difficult ground conditions and was awarded £40,000 (over a contract price of £100,000) at arbitration.

=== Opening at last ===
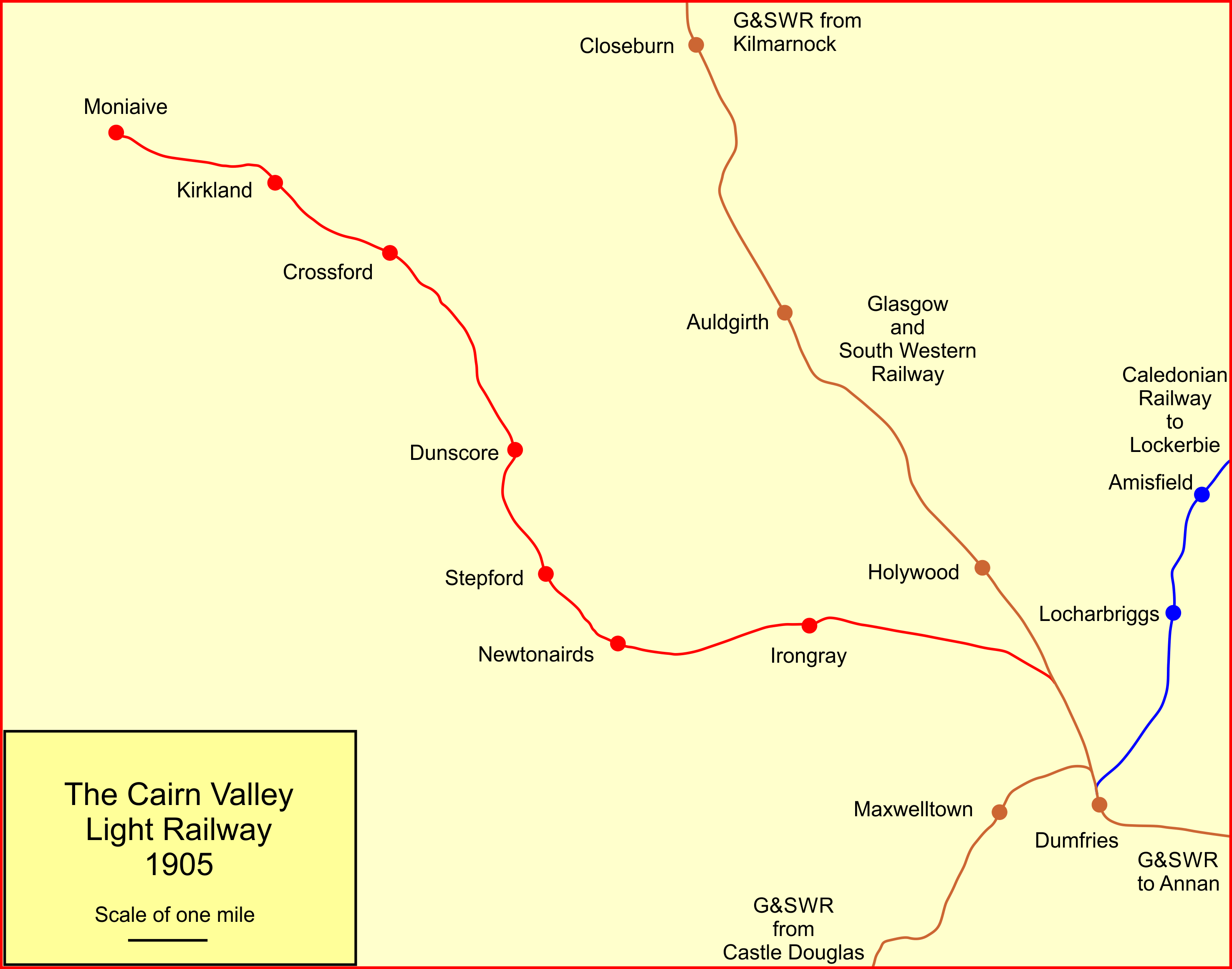
System map of the Cairn Valley Light Railway in 1905

The directors planned an official opening of the line for 31 December 1904, but this proved impossible as the Board of Trade inspecting officer was unable to schedule his visit to approve the opening; a celebratory dinner took place nonetheless. In fact the ceremonial opening took place on 28 February 1905 and the full public opening of the line followed the next day, 1 March 1905. There were three passenger trains each way daily, four on Wednesdays an Saturdays, and none on Sundays.

At this time the main line railways were introducing railmotors, light vehicles in which a small steam engine is closely coupled to a passenger coach with through driving controls, as an economic means of operating lightly used lines. The G&SWR decided to operate the Cairn Valley line with such a vehicle, and one was built at Kilmarnock Works for the purpose. Two more followed from November 1905. Railmotor no. 3 is shown at Dumfries in a photograph following page 56 of Smith's Tales.

These units were not mechanically successful, and after an unsuccessful experiment in which the steam engine of the railmotor was decoupled, operating as an ordinary steam engine, the railmotor operation was discontinued, from 1909, and conventional locomotive operation instituted. An 0-4-4T no 269 became the mainstay on the line.

=== Disappointing custom ===
The passenger carryings on the line did not live up to early expectation, and in fact declined from 4,800 journeys in 1906 to 3,600 in 1913, 2,500 in 1918 and dropping to 1,000 in 1923. There was little goods traffic on the rural line.

In 1921 the passenger operation was losing £1,600 annually, and from that time local bus operators started operating bus services which were more convenient, further worsening custom on the railway.

=== Closure ===
During the Second World War, the need for economy was extreme and continuation of the passenger service was considered to be unviable; the last passenger train ran on 1 May 1943, with closure being reckoned from 3 May 1943. The sparse goods service continued, but it too was closed on 4 July 1949. During the following winter, long stretches of the formation were washed away during winter storms, and any realistic chance of reinstatement was lost.

== Accident, 1911 ==
There was a serious accident on 6 January 1911 at Irongray; a passenger train and a goods train were to cross at the station; the signalman (also the Station Master) operated the loop entry points prematurely as the goods train approached, and it collided with the other train.

== Signalling ==
When constructed, the line had a novel signalling system, consisting of a modification of Sykes Lock and Block system for single lines, obviating train staffs, and elevated disc fixed signals. Treadles at stations verified the passage of trains and interlocked signals for conflicting moves; if a train operated the treadle at the entrance to the line to the next block post, it had to proceed, there being no method of cancelling the movement.

The system was somewhat complicated, and it was removed in 1936, being then replaced by a conventional key token system between Cairn Valley Junction (on the main line) and Dunscore. The other passing places were abolished, and the line from Dunscore to Moniaive was operated under the One Engine in Steam arrangement, with a train staff.

== Topography ==
The line was 17.5 miles (28.2 km) long and there were stations at Irongray, Newtonairds, Stepford, Dunscore, Crossford and Kirkland. Irongray, Newtonairds, Dunscore and Moniaive were considered to be "stations" and had passing facilities (until 1936), while Crossford, Kirkland and Stepford were designated "stopping places", and had a simple wooden platform and small shelter for passengers. There was originally planned to have been a station at Drumpark near Newtonairds, but the requirement was removed during the construction period.

The connection with the main line was at Cairn Valley Junction, a little over a mile north of Dumfries.

The line fell all the way from Moniaive to the main line; the ruling gradient for ascending trains was 1 in 80. The vertical interval was 270 feet (82 m). There was a seven-span viaduct over the Cluden Water.

== Connections to other lines ==
- Glasgow, Dumfries and Carlisle Railway at Cairn Valley Junction

== The route today ==
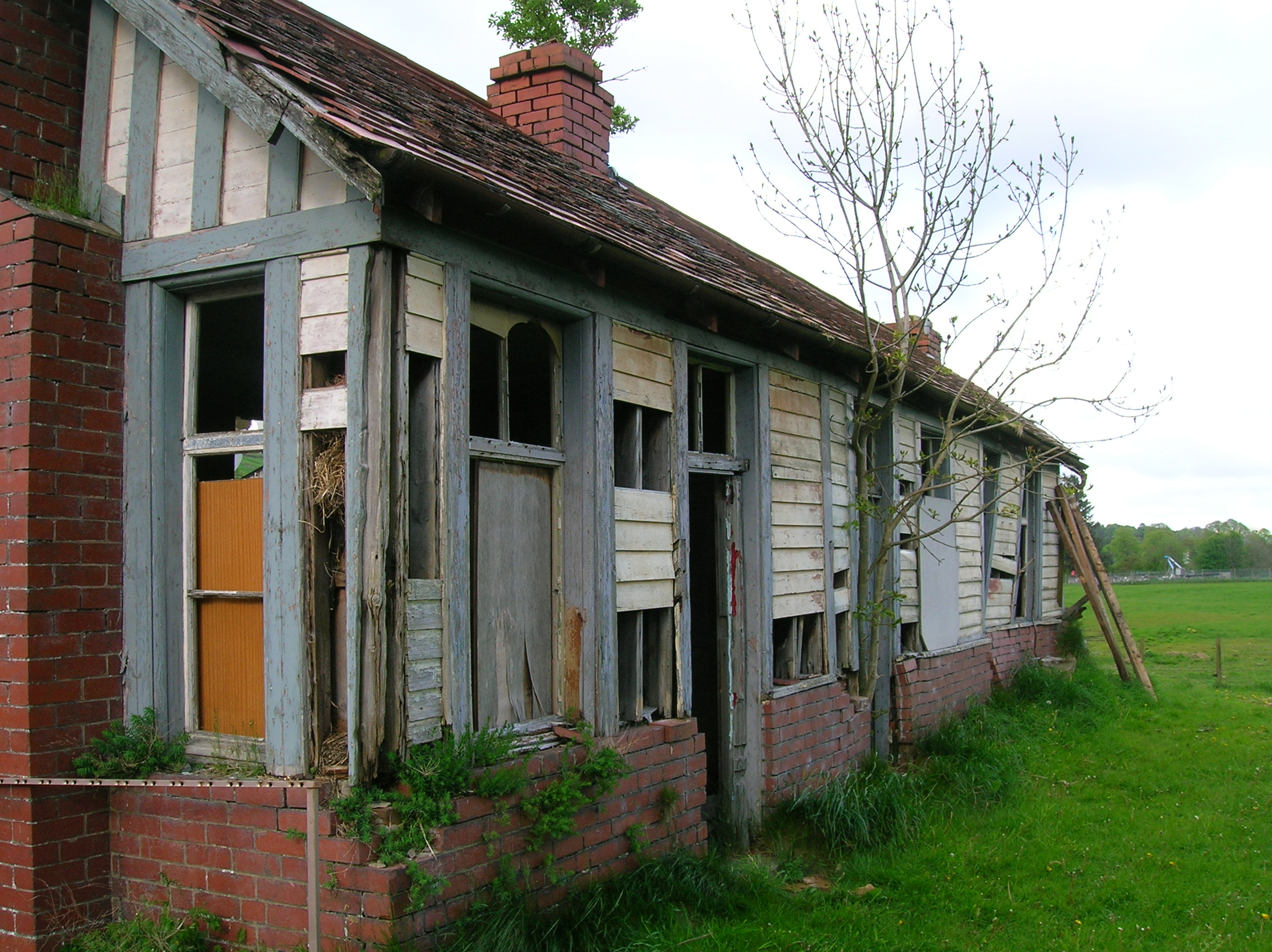
The frontage of Moniaive station in 2009

The line is closed and lifted.

There was little left of the railway in 2011. The wood and brick station building at Moniaive survives in use as a farm shed but is slowly disintegrating. The Moniaive station goods shed, used as a farm store, was badly damaged by fire in 2012. Most of the other stations are intact as private houses. The graceful brick built three-arch Dunscore Viaduct survives but is partly hidden by trees. Part of the old trackbed is used as a farm track in places though much has been ploughed up. Near Dunscore a deep cutting has been filled in with stone waste.

== Bibliography ==
- Awdry, Christopher (1990). Encyclopaedia of British Railway Companies. Sparkford: Patrick Stephens Ltd. ISBN 1-8526-0049-7. OCLC 19514063. CN 8983.
- "Cairn Valley Light Railway - Moniaive to Dumfries". Transport Diversions Emporium. Archived from the original on 16 October 2009.
- Jowett, Alan (March 1989). Jowett's Railway Atlas of Great Britain and Ireland: From Pre-Grouping to the Present Day (1st ed.). Sparkford: Patrick Stephens Ltd. ISBN 978-1-85260-086-0. OCLC 22311137.
