= Kilpatrick =

Kilpatrick is surname of Irish and Scottish origin, a variant of a name Kirkpatrick. It may refer to:

== People ==
- Bill Kilpatrick, rugby league footballer of the 1920s and 1930s for Other Nationalities, and Oldham
- Carl Kilpatrick, professional basketball player
- Carolyn Cheeks Kilpatrick (1945–2025), American politician from Detroit, Michigan
- Charles Kilpatrick (athlete) (1874–1921), American athlete
- Charles Kilpatrick (politician) (1872–1935), trade union president and member of the Queensland Legislative Council
- Hugh Judson Kilpatrick (1836–1881), American Union Army general; U.S. Minister to Chile
- J. Max Kilpatrick (1945–2024), American judge and politician
- James J. Kilpatrick (1920–2010), American columnist and television commentator
- John Kilpatrick (American athlete) (1889–1960), American athlete, soldier, and sports businessperson
- Judith Kilpatrick (1952–2002), English headteacher
- Julie Kilpatrick (born 1983), Scottish field hockey player
- Kim Kilpatrick, Canadian Paralympic swimmer
- Kwame Kilpatrick (born 1970), American politician, former mayor of Detroit, Michigan
- Macgregor Kilpatrick (1916–1997), American WWII veteran and Navy Cross recipient, original owner of the New Haven Nighthawks
- Nancy Kilpatrick (1946–2025), Canadian author
- Patrick Kilpatrick (born 1949), American actor
- Robin Kilpatrick, Scottish footballer
- Sean Kilpatrick (born 1990), American basketball player
- William Heard Kilpatrick (1871–1965), American educator
- Sir William John Kilpatrick, Australian air force officer, charity and community worker, responsible for setting up the Winston Churchill Memorial Trust in Australia

== Places ==
- Castletown-Kilpatrick, a village in County Meath, Republic of Ireland
- Kilpatrick, Ardnurcher, a townland in Ardnurcher civil parish, barony of Moycashel, County Westmeath, Republic of Ireland
- Kilpatrick, County Antrim, Northern Ireland, a townland of County Antrim
- Kilpatrick, County Cork, a civil parish in County Cork, Republic of Ireland
- Kilpatrick, County Kildare, a civil parish in County Kildare, Republic of Ireland
- Kilpatrick, County Westmeath (civil parish), a civil parish in the barony of Fore, Republic of Ireland
- Kilpatrick, Fore, a townland in Kilpatrick civil parish, barony of Fore, County Westmeath, Republic of Ireland
- Kilpatrick, Leny, a townland in Leny civil parish, barony of Corkaree, County Westmeath, Republic of Ireland
- Kilpatrick, Mullingar, a townland in Mullingar civil parish, barony of Moyashel and Magheradernon, County Westmeath, Republic of Ireland
- Kilpatrick, Rathconrath, a townland in Rathconrath civil parish, barony of Rathconrath, County Westmeath, Republic of Ireland
- Kilpatrick, Tipperary, a civil parish in County Tipperary, Republic of Ireland
- Kilpatrick, Alabama, a town in northeast Alabama.
- Kilpatrick Hills, central Scotland
- New Kilpatrick, East Dunbartonshire, Scotland
- Old Kilpatrick, West Dunbartonshire, Scotland

== Other uses ==
- Clan Kirkpatrick, a Lowland Scottish clan
- John Kilpatrick Turnpike, Oklahoma, United States
- Macgregor Kilpatrick Trophy, American Hockey League trophy
- Kilpatrick limit, the maximum electric field achievable in particle accelerators
- Kilpatrick Townsend & Stockton, law firm
- Oysters Kilpatrick (also called Oysters Kirkpatrick), English recipe involving oysters, cheese, and bacon

== See also ==
- Kirkpatrick (disambiguation)
