= Kirkpatrick =

Kirkpatrick is a Scottish surname popular in Ireland (Ulster) and, and occasionally a given name, possibly a branch of the Cenél nEógain of the Northern Uí Néill. The name traditionally relates to a church ("kirk") dedicated to Saint Patrick.

== Surname ==
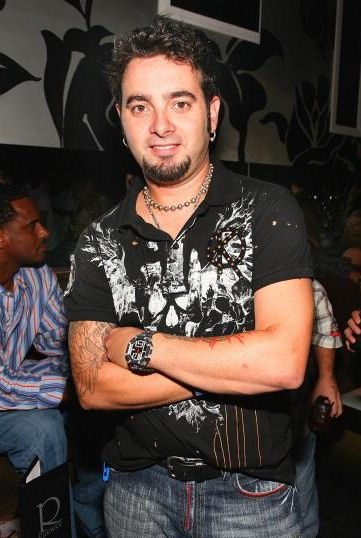
Chris Kirkpatrick

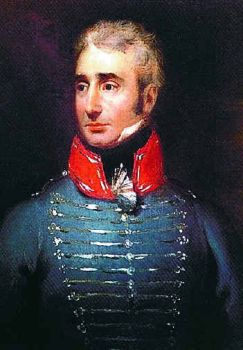
James Achilles Kirkpatrick

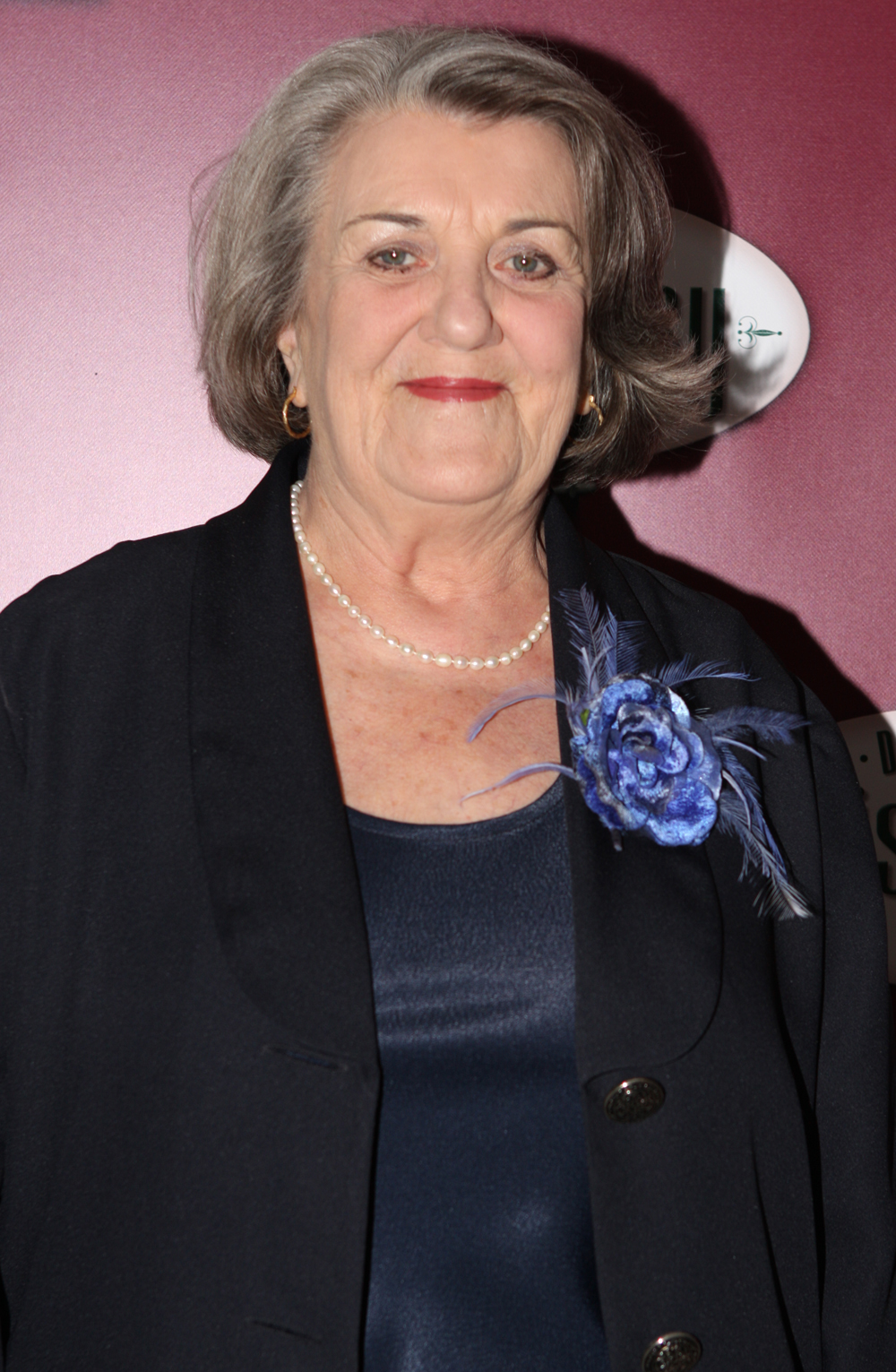
Maggie Kirkpatrick

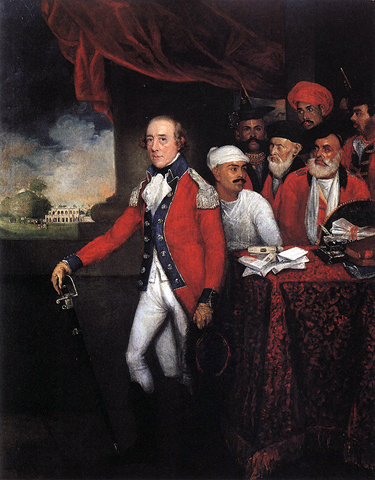
William Kirkpatrick

- Alexander Kirkpatrick (1849–1940), British professor of Hebrew and biblical commentator
- Alexander Kirkpatrick (rugby union) (1898–1971), New Zealand rugby union player
- Andrew Kirkpatrick (lawyer) (1756–1831), Chief Justice of New Jersey Supreme Court
- Andrew Kirkpatrick (judge) (1844–1904), U.S. District Court for New Jersey, grandson of Andrew Kirkpatrick (1756–1831) (above)
- Andrew Kirkpatrick (politician) (1848–1928), South Australian politician
- Andy Kirkpatrick (born 1971), British climber and writer
- Ann Kirkpatrick (born 1950), American politician—Arizona
- Barbro Owens-Kirkpatrick (born 1946), American diplomat
- Bob Kirkpatrick (musician) (born 1934), American Texas blues guitarist, singer and songwriter
- Chris Kirkpatrick (born 1971), American musician
- Clayton Kirkpatrick (1915–2004), American journalist and newspaper editor
- Conilee Kirkpatrick (born 1948), American electronics engineer
- Cyril Kirkpatrick (1872–1957), British civil engineer
- David Kirkpatrick (producer) (born 1951), American film producer
- David Gordon Kirkpatrick (1927–2003), Australian country musician known as Slim Dusty
- David G. Kirkpatrick, Canadian computer scientist
- Donald Kirkpatrick (1924–2014, fl. 1960s), American educator
- Ethel Kirkpatrick (1869–1966), British artist and jeweller
- Frederick Douglass Kirkpatrick (1933–1986), African-American musician, civil rights activist, and minister
- Gary Kirkpatrick (1941–2021), American concert pianist
- George Airey Kirkpatrick (1841–1899), Canadian politician
- George Kirkpatrick (Florida politician) (1938–2003), American politician
- Harry Kirkpatrick (born c. 1958), Irish activist and convict
- Ian Kirkpatrick (born 1946), New Zealand rugby union player
- Ivone Kirkpatrick (1897–1964), British diplomat
- J. Davy Kirkpatrick, American astronomer
- James Kirkpatrick (disambiguation), various people
- Jeane Kirkpatrick (1926–2006), American diplomat for whom the American political doctrine, Kirkpatrick Doctrine, is named
- Joey Kirkpatrick (born 1952), American glass artist, sculptor, wire artist, and educator
- John Kirkpatrick (rugby league) (born 1979), British player
- John Kirkpatrick (folk musician) (born 1947), English musician
- John Simpson Kirkpatrick (1892–1915), British-born Australian soldier
- Joseph Kirkpatrick (1872–1930), British artist
- Karey Kirkpatrick (born 1964), American writer
- Kitty Kirkpatrick (1802–1889), Anglo-Indian noblewoman, muse of the philosopher Thomas Carlyle
- Littleton Kirkpatrick (1797–1859), 19th-century American attorney, political figure
- Lyman Kirkpatrick (1916–1995), American government administrator
- Maggie Kirkpatrick (born 1941), Australian actress
- María Manuela Kirkpatrick (1794–1879), Spanish royal family member
- Martha Kirkpatrick (1925–2015), American psychoanalyst and clinical professor of psychiatry
- Nora Kirkpatrick (born 1984), American actress and musician, founding member of Edward Sharpe and the Magnetic Zeros
- Ralph Kirkpatrick (1911–1984), American musician, musicologist and cataloguer of the works of Domenico Scarlatti
- Randolph Kirkpatrick (1863–1950), British naturalist and author
- Roger de Kirkpatrick (fl. 14th century), Scottish activist
- Samuel A. Kirkpatrick, president of the University of Texas at San Antonio and Eastern Michigan University
- Sanford Kirkpatrick (1842–1932), American politician—Iowa
- Sean M. Kirkpatrick, physicist and director of All-domain Anomaly Resolution Office
- Sidney D. Kirkpatrick (1955–2025), American documentary filmmaker and historical author
- Snyder S. Kirkpatrick (1848–1909), American politician—Kansas
- Sophia Astley Kirkpatrick (1802–1871), wife of Littleton Kirkpatrick (above), donor to Rutgers College
- Sydney Kirkpatrick (1881–1930), African American actor and singer
- Ted Kirkpatrick (1960–2022), American musician
- Timothy Kirkpatrick (born 1978), American drummer
- Thomas Kirkpatrick (Canadian politician) (1805–1870), Canadian politician
- Thomas Kirkpatrick (New York), New York politician
- Thomas J. Kirkpatrick (1829–1897), American lawyer and politician
- Wayne Kirkpatrick (born c. 1960), American musician
- William Kirkpatrick (disambiguation), various people

== Given name ==
- Kirkpatrick Macmillan (1812–1878), Scottish blacksmith and inventor of the mechanical bicycle
- Kirkpatrick Sale, American author, technology critic and tax resister

== See also ==
- Kirkpatrick baronets
- Clan Kirkpatrick, a Scottish clan
- Kirkpatrick & Lockhart, an American law firm
- Oysters Kirkpatrick (also called Oysters Kilpatrick), an English recipe involving oysters, cheese, and bacon
- Kilpatrick (disambiguation)
