= Grierson (name) =

Grierson is a surname of Scottish origin. The name is possibly a patronymic form of the personal name Grier or Grere, which may have reflected the Scots pronunciation of Gregor. The earliest known spellings are Grersoun and Greresoun. It was common practice in SW Scotland, particularly in the 16th and 17th centuries, for the name to be abbreviated to Grier, and there are many instances of the two forms being used in reference to the same man in the same document. This usage was further modified to Greer by a cadet branch of the Lag family who migrated to Ireland.

== People surnamed Grierson ==
- Alister Grierson (born 1969), Australian film director
- Benjamin Grierson (1826–1911), American Army General
- Cecilia Grierson (1859–1934), Argentine physician and activist
- Colin McKay Grierson (1906–1991), Royal Air Force Air Commodore
- Constantia Grierson (1705–1732), Irish author
- Darrell Philip Grierson (born 1968), English footballer
- David Grierson (1955–2004), Canadian CBC radio host
- Derek Grierson (1931–2011), Scottish football player
- Don Grierson (geneticist), British geneticist
- Don Grierson (ice hockey) (born 1947), Canadian professional hockey player
- Edgar Grierson (1884–1959), British Labour Party politician
- Edmund Grierson (1860–1922), Canadian municipal politician
- Edward Grierson (1914–1975), British barrister and writer
- Francis Grierson (1848–1927), English born American author
- George Grierson (politician) (1867–1931), Canadian politician
- George Grierson (printer) (c. 1678 – 1753), Scottish-born printer in Dublin
- George Abraham Grierson (1851–1941), Irish orientalist, linguist and civil servant
- Henry Grierson (1891–1972), English cricketer, barrister and author,
- Herbert John Clifford Grierson (1866–1960), Scottish literary critic
- James Grierson (British Army officer) (1859–1914), British Army Lieutenant General
- James Grierson (minister, born 1791) (1791–1875), Scottish Moderator of the General Assembly to the Free Church of Scotland
- Jasmine Grierson (born 1998). Australian rules footballer
- John Grierson (1898–1972), Scottish born Canadian film-maker
- John Grierson (pilot), (1909–1977), British pilot and author
- John Grierson (Dominican), or Grisson (died 1564?), Scottish Dominican principal of the King's College
- Margaret Storrs Grierson (1900–1997), American philosophy professor and archivist of the Sophia Smith Collection
- Mary Grierson (1912–2012), Welsh-born Scottish botanical artist and illustrator
- Murray Grierson, Scottish rally driver
- Philip Grierson (1910–2006), British historian and numismatist
- Robert Grierson (1657–1733), Scottish baronet, 1st Baronet of Lag, Nova Scotia Baronet
- Robert Grierson (missionary) (1868–1965), Canadian Presbyterian minister
- Roger Grierson (born 1957), New Zealand musician and executive
- Sir Ronald Grierson (1921–2014), British banker, businessman, government advisor, and British Army officer
- Ruby Grierson (1903–1940), Scottish documentary film-maker
- Sharon Grierson (born 1951), Australian politician
- Sir William Grierson, 2nd Baronet (c. 1677–1760), Scottish Jacobite, MP for Dumfriesshire 1709–1711
- Trevor Grierson (1849–1913), New Zealand cricketer
- William Grierson (engineer) (1863–1935), British civil engineer on the Great Western Railway, president of the Institution of Civil Engineers 1929–30

== People named Grierson ==
- Robert Grierson Combe (1880–1917), Scottish born Canadian, Canadian Expeditionary Force Lieutenant awarded the Victoria Cross

== Other ==
- Simpson Grierson, a New Zealand law firm
- Clan Grierson, a Lowlands Scottish Clan
- Grierson Baronets, a dormant title in the Baronetage of Nova Scotia

== See also ==
- Grier, a surname
