= William Grierson =

William Grierson may refer to:

- Sir William Grierson, 2nd Baronet (c. 1677–1760), Scottish Jacobite, MP for Dumfriesshire 1709–1711
- William Grierson (engineer) (1863–1935), British civil engineer, president of the Institution of Civil Engineers from 1929–30
- William Grierson (footballer) (born 1998), Filipino footballer

== See also ==
- Grierson (name)
