= James Kirkpatrick =

James or Jim Kirkpatrick may refer to:

== Political people ==
- James Kirkpatrick (politician) (1905–1997), American politician, Secretary of State of Missouri (1965–1985)
- James Achilles Kirkpatrick (1764–1805), British Resident in Hyderabad from 1798 to 1805
- Jim Kirkpatrick (Northern Ireland politician), Unionist politician in Northern Ireland
- Jim Kirkpatrick (Illinois politician), member of the Illinois House of Representatives
- James J. Kilpatrick (1920–2010), American newspaper journalist and columnist
- James W. Kirkpatrick (1863–1928), Canadian politician from Nova Scotia

== Sportsmen ==
- Sir James Kirkpatrick, 8th Baronet (1841–1899), appeared in the 1878 FA Cup Final
- James Kirkpatrick (field hockey) (born 1991), Canadian field hockey player
- Jimmy Kirkpatrick, footballer who played for Plymouth Argyle in the 1910s and 1920s
- Jim Kirkpatrick (footballer) (1903–?), Scottish footballer, played for Leeds United and Watford in 1920s

== Others ==
- James Kirkpatrick (minister) (died 1743), Irish minister
- Sir James Kirkpatrick, 4th Baronet (died 1804), of the Kirkpatrick baronets
- Sir James Kirkpatrick, 10th Baronet (1918–1954), of the Kirkpatrick baronets
- Kevin DeAnna, a white nationalist writer who uses the pen name James Kirkpatrick

== See also ==
- Kirkpatrick (disambiguation)
