= Rockhall Tower =

Castle in Dumfries, Scotland

- Rockhall House
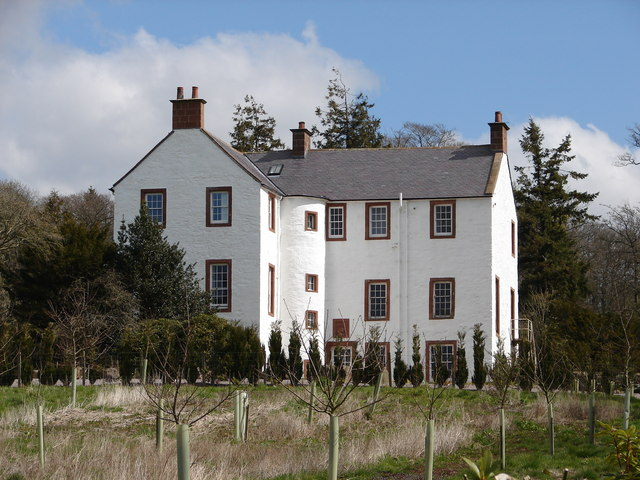
- Rockhall Tower in 2008

- Location within Scotland
- 55°03′56″N 3°28′42″W
- Location: Collin, Dumfries and Galloway, Scotland

History
- Built: 16th century

Site notes
- Owner: Clan Kirkpatrick; Clan Grierson; Morgan family Rose family Mitchell family

Rockhall Tower, also known as Rockhall House or Rockhall Tower House, is a 16th-century tower house in Collin, Dumfries and Galloway. The castle originally belonged to Clan Kirkpatrick and later passed, through marriage, into Clan Grierson, becoming the home of the Grierson baronets. Sir Robert Grierson, 1st Baronet lived here until his death in 1733.

== History ==
A little over a kilometer away from the house are the remains of Rockhall Mote, a 12th-century motte and bailey castle. Near the mote there was a chapel that was built sometime in the 1200s, when the land was under the possession of William of Glencairn. At the end of the 13th-century, Robert de Brus, 6th Lord of Annandale granted the chapel to the Gisborough Priory.

It is unknown the exact date of when the first tower was built at Rockhall, but the estate originally beclonged to the Clan Kirkpatrick of Closeburn. On 14 November 1412, Gilbert Grierson, 2nd Lord of Lag, married Isabel Kirkpatrick, the daughter of Sir Duncan Kirkpatrick of Torthorwald Castle and Rockhall, and the estate eventually passed to their son, Vedast Grierson, 3rd Lord of Lag. Rockhall remained in the Grierson family until the 1950s.

In 1526, James V of Scotland erected the Rockhall lands into a feudal barony for Sir John Grierson, 6th Lord of Lag. In the late 16th century, extensions were made to the house, tripling the length of the building. A projecting wing was added to the southside of the house in the 17th century.

Sir Robert Grierson, 1st Baronet took up residence at Rockhall in his later years with his wife, Lady Henrietta Douglas, and their five children. Lady Henrietta was a sister of William Douglas, 1st Duke of Queensberry. After the death of Sir Robert, Rockhall then passed to their eldest son, Sir William Grierson, 2nd Baronet. Sir William died in 1737 and the estate passed to his brother, Sir Gilbert. Sir Gilbert died in 1766 and left the house to Sir Robert Grierson, who brought the old entrance gateway from Mouswald Tower to Rockhall's stables in 1815. Sir Robert was succeeded in 1839 by his son, Sir Alexander, who died the following year. Then Rockhall went to the eldest son, Sir Richard, who owned the castle until his death in 1846. A second son, Sir Alexander, inherited the house and commissioned Alexander Crombie to remodel it between 1854 and 1855. After Sir Alexander's death in 1879, Rockhall went to his nephew, Sir Alexander Davidson Grierson, 9th Baronet, who commissioned James Barbour to remodel the interior of the house in 1880. Alternations were made in 1915 by JM Bowie, who was hired by Sir Robert Grierson, including a new entrance to the south of the stair tower.

In the 20th century, the Grierson's let out Rockhall to the Reid family in the 1920s and the Morgan family in the 1930s and 1940s. Sir Robert Grierson sold Rockhall Tower in 1951 to Brigadier Russell Morgan. In 1963, the castle was put up for sale by Brigadier D.R. Morgan, who was a relative to the Griersons by marriage.

Rockhall was converted into a hotel, called the Rockhall Country House Hotel, but it was converted back into a private residence in 1997. The property includes the castle, log cabin used as a holiday rental, and a 10-acre garden.
