= Collin, Dumfries and Galloway =

Coordinates: 55.0677°N 3.525°W

Collin
- Location within Dumfries and Galloway
- Council area: Dumfries and Galloway
- Country: Scotland
- Sovereign state: United Kingdom
- Post town: DUMFRIES
- Postcode district: DG1/2
- Dialling code: 01387
- Police: Scotland
- Fire: Scottish
- Ambulance: Scottish
- UK Parliament: Dumfries and Galloway; Dumfriesshire, Clydesdale and Tweeddale
- Scottish Parliament: Dumfriesshire

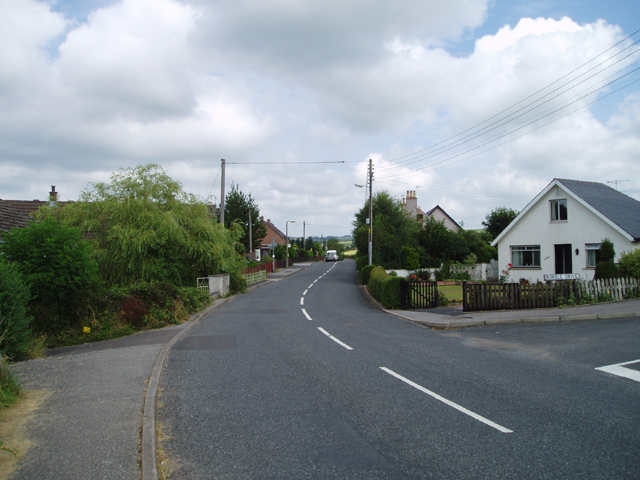
Collin, Dumfries and Galloway

Collin is a small village between Dumfries and Gretna in Dumfries and Galloway, Scotland. It is located on the Lochar Water, and the A75 road. It lies 5.3 km east of Dumfries, and 20 km north-west of Annan. It has a cemetery. Rockhall Tower, a castle once owned by the Grierson baronets, is in Collin.
