= Battle of Dryfe Sands =

Scottish clan battle between Clan Maxwell and Clan Johnstone in 1593

- Part of Johnstone-Maxwell feud
- Coats of arms of the chief of Clan Johnstone (left) and chief of Clan Maxwell (right)
Date	6 December 1593
Location	Annandale, Scotland
Result	Johnstone victory

Belligerents
Clan Johnstone; Clan Scott; Clan Graham	Clan Maxwell; Clan Grierson; Clan Pollock

Commanders and leaders
Sir James Johnstone	Lord John Maxwell †

Strength
600–800	2,000

Casualties and losses
"Heavy" (only 160 survivors)	700 killed

The Battle of Dryfe Sands was a Scottish clan battle that took place on 6 December 1593, near Lockerbie, Scotland. It was fought between the Clan Maxwell and Clan Johnstone after a hundred years of feuding between them. The Johnstones won a decisive victory over the Maxwells.

== Background ==
In 1585, John Maxwell, 8th Lord Maxwell, was declared a rebel for having quarreled with the Earl of Arran who was a favorite of James VI of Scotland. A commission was therefore given to Johnstone, Lord of Annandale, who was then the Warden of the West Marches. Because Maxwell had numerous vassals and friends, it was thought necessary to send two bands of mercenaries to support Johnstone. However, these two companies, that were commanded by captains Cranston and Lammie, were attacked at Crawfordmoor and cut to pieces by a party of Maxwells who were under the command of Robert Maxwell, natural brother to the chief. He followed up this advantage by burning Johnstone's Lochwood Castle. In a subsequent conflict Johnstone himself was defeated and taken prisoner, and is said to have died of the grief at the disgrace which he had sustained.

Maxwell was soon restored in the King's favor, and obtained the Wardenship of the West Marches. He subscribed a bond of alliance with Lord James Johnstone, son of the slain Lord Johnstone, and for some time the two clans lived in peace. However, the feud was revived in 1593 when Johnstone of Wamphray who was a relation of Lord Johnstone, along with some friends, went to Nithsdale and took away a horse which belonged to Crichton of Sanquhar. They were pursued by Crichton and some of his friends who took Johnstone prisoner and hanged him from a tree. A nephew of Johnstone of Wamphrey, William Johnstone, managed to escape from the Crichtons and raised a powerful band of Johnstones, again going over to Nithsdale, and swept the country of cattle. Crichton of Sanquhar and Douglas of Drumlanrig raising what forces they could muster attacked the Johnstones at a place called Biddes-burn, but were completely defeated and the Johnstones carried off the spoil. In this encounter several Johnstones and fifteen Crichtons were killed.

The men of Nithsdale resolved that they would apply to Lord Maxwell for assistance and protection. However, Maxwell would not easily embrace their cause because of his recent reconciliation with Johnstone. They overcame this by entering into a bond of manrent with Maxwell and therefore became his followers and liege-men. In return he granted to them a bond of maintenance or protection in which he bound himself to maintain them in their feuds. Some of the most powerful families in Dumfriesshire therefore became vassals of the house of Maxwell, including: Kirkpatrick of Closeburn, Douglas of Drumlanrig (ancestor of the Duke of Queensberry), Crichton of Sanquhar (ancestor of the Earl of Dumfries), Stuart of Castlemilk, Stuart of Garlies (ancestor of the Earl of Galloway), the Murrays, Lord Annandale, Grierson of Lag, Gordon of Lochmaben, and many others in the south-west of Scotland, all binding themselves as vassals of Maxwell.

Johnstone was subsequently informed that Crichton, Douglas, and a number of others had put themselves under the protection of Maxwell and the warfare between the rival clans was instantly renewed. Buccleuch, chief of the Scotts, who was a near relation of Johnstone, came to his assistance with his clan, which not only included the Clan Scott but also the Clan Eliott, Clan Armstrong, and Clan Graham. Johnstone having been reinforced, he surprised and cut to pieces a party of Maxwells who were stationed at Lochmaben. Among the slain was Robert Maxwell, brother of the chief, who had burnt Johnstone's castle at Lochwood. The Maxwells had taken refuge in Lochmaben Church, which they defended for some time, until the Johnstones burnt the church and everyone inside it.

== Battle ==
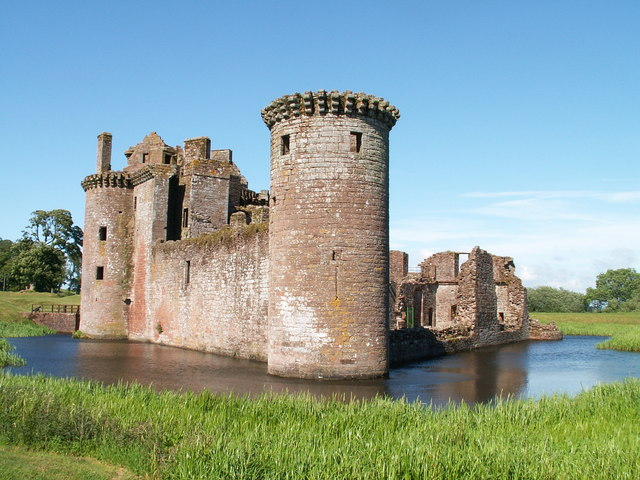
Ruins of Caerlaverock Castle, historic seat of the chiefs of Clan Maxwell

Lord Maxwell, highly incensed by this outrage, entered into Annandale with 2,000 men, including all of the barons of Nithsdale and also some Royal troops. He apparently offered a reward of a £10 land to anyone who could bring him Johnstone's head or hand. The Scotts were a fierce and war-like clan and Dame Margaret Johnstone, being a daughter of Buccleuch, three hundred Scotts came to join Johnstone of Lochwood. As Buccleuch was away, they were led by the Laird of Elibank. They were joined by two of Johnstone's retainers near Lockerbie, Johnstone of Kirktoun, who had a large following and Johnstone of Lockerbie, who had fifty men. They were also joined by the Grahams from the Debatable Lands, who were apparently always ready to fight the Maxwells. Johnstone took the high ground above where the Dryfe joines the Annan. Upon Maxwell's approach a small body of the Johnstones came forward from the rest and taunted the Maxwells who were then tempted up the slope. The Johnstones, Scotts, and Grahams then left the heights and rushed down on their enemies. A desperate conflict took place in which Johnstone gained the victory. Lord Maxwell apparently performed "prodigies" of valor but was among the slain. Many of his followers were also slain. The barons of Lag, Closeburn, and Drumlanrig escaped thanks to their horses.

According to Marchbank, 700 Maxwells were killed in the battle. John Pollock, son of the chief of Clan Pollock, was killed supporting the Maxwells. Some who escaped are said to have had "Lockerbie licks" on their faces, caused by being slashed by the swords of pursuing horsemen. However, it is likely that Johnstone's losses were also heavy as in 1594 he obtained a respite from the King for himself and just eight score (160) surviving followers. Among those killed on Johnstone's side was Bell of Albie who was killed whilst in pursuit of the Maxwells. According to the New Statistical Account of Scotland, "the Albie Thorn" was planted on the spot where Bell of Albie fell, which was within 500 yards of the church. One of the Johnstones of Cummertrees was also killed in the battle.

== Aftermath ==
Lord Maxwell's cousin, William Maxwell, 5th Lord Herries of Terregles, became the next Warden of the West Marches. He ignored the respite and tried to capture Johnstone's followers. In doing so he kept the country in a state of confusion and as a result the King superseded him as the Warden with Johnstone himself. Douglas of Drumlanrig could not forgive the defeat at Dryfe Sands, and on 13 July 1597 attacked Johnstone with his "assisters" but failed to capture two rebel Armstrongs. As a result of this fight, Johnstone was deprived of the Wardenship, but it was given to his ally, Sir John Carmichael. In 1608, Sir James Johnstone, now the Warden of the Marches, met up with John Maxwell, 9th Lord Maxwell who was son of the slain Warden, at Tinwald for the purpose of ending the feud peaceably. However, Maxwell shot Johnstone and then fled to the Continent. When he returned he was executed in Edinburgh, in 1613, for high treason and for the slaying of the Warden of the Marches.

Between 1591 and 1594 the peace in Scotland was disturbed on several occasions by the activities of Francis Stewart, 5th Earl of Bothwell. This resulted in a serious revolt of the Catholic dissidents in the north-east. However, with the death of Lord Maxwell, who was a staunch Catholic, at the Battle of Dryfe Sands in 1593 and the fall of the northern Earls after the Battle of Glenlivet in 1594, the Catholic cause was destroyed.
