= John Grierson (disambiguation) =

John Grierson was a Scottish documentary filmmaker.

John Grierson may also refer to:

- John Grierson (pilot) (1909–1977), English long-distance flier, test pilot, author, and aviation administrator
- John Grierson (Dominican) (died 1564), Dominican prior
