= Roger de Kirkpatrick =

Scottish nobleman

Sir Roger de Kirkpatrick of Closeburn (fl. 14th century) was a Scottish gentleman, a 3rd cousin and associate of Robert the Bruce, a 1st cousin of Sir William Wallace. He was born 1276 to Sir Stephen Kirkpatrick, Lord of Closeburn (30 at the time) and Lady Isabella de Torthorwald (26 at the time) at the Kirkpatrick stronghold of Closeburn Castle and died in 1323, believed to have been murdered in revenge for his killing of John "Red" Comyn.

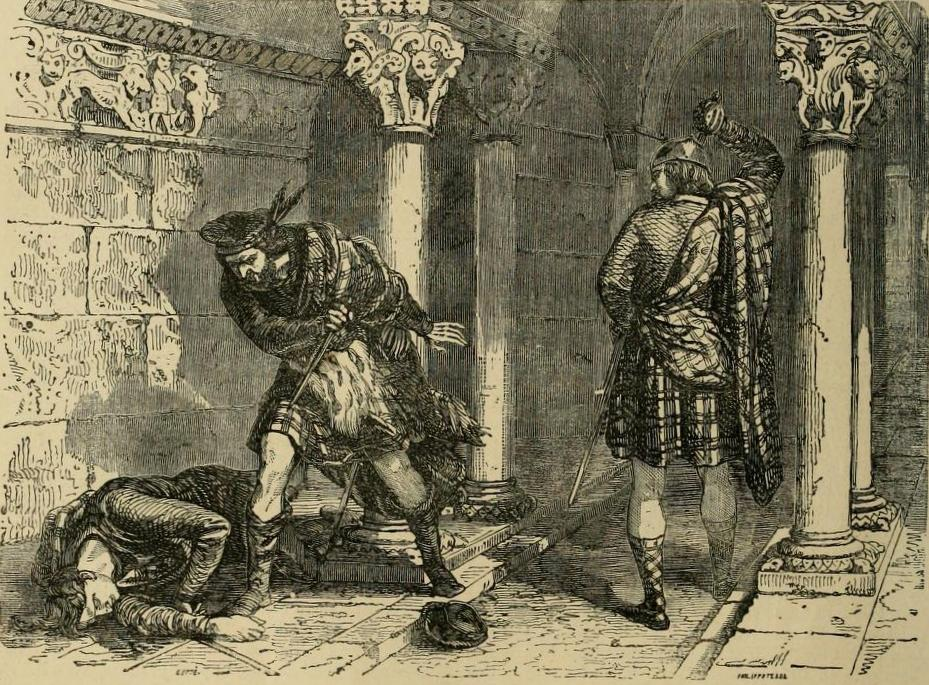
The killing of John Comyn in the Greyfriars church in Dumfries, as seen by Félix Philippoteaux, a 19th-century illustrator.

Arms granted to Roger de Kirkpatrick of Closeburn: Argent, a saltire and chief azure, the last charged with three cushions or.

Roger de Kirkpatrick is listed in most histories with the following sons:

- Sir Thomas KIRKPATRICK of Closeburn and Bridburgh, d. Abt 1358.
- Sir Roger KIRKPATRICK, 1st and last Kirkpatrick of Caerlaverock, b. 1314, d. 24 Jun 1358, Caerlaverock Castle, Dumfriesshire, Scotland.

Roger's son, Sir Thomas Kirkpatrick, besides inheriting Closeburn, got the lands of Redburgh in the sheriffdom of Dumfries, as the charter of Robert de Brus bears, dated at Lochmaben, 4 January in the 14th year of his reign. In 1355, Sir Thomas’ son, Sir Roger, who remained faithful amidst the general defection of the nobles, distinguished himself by taking from the English the castle of Caerlaverock and Dalswinton, and thus preserved the whole territory of Nithsdale in allegiance to the Scottish crown.

Kirkpatrick swore fealty to King Edward I in 1269, and was appointed one of the deputy justiciars of Scotland, given responsibility for Galloway in partnership with the English justiciar Walter de Burghdon. This appointment is recorded in the Ordinances of 1305, by which Edward I attempted to order the administration of a Scotland reduced to the status of a "land" instead of a realm. An ally of Robert Bruce, Kirkpatrick in the Chapel of Greyfriars Monastery in Dumfries on 10 February 1306 when Bruce quarreled with John "the Red" Comyn and Rodger de Kirkpatrick ensured the kill by stabbing him saying "i mak sikker" the family motto.

The exact sequence of events is disputed by historians but some traditions suggest that Bruce had earlier proposed that he and Comyn unite against Edward I, a plan which Comyn subsequently betrayed to the English king, a betrayal which led to the conflict at Dumfries and Comyn's death. Kirkpatrick's actions are well-known but attested to be a tale (according to Geoffrey Barrow). Bruce, having wounded Comyn with his dagger, rushed from the church and encountered his attendants outside. Bruce told them what had happened and said, "I must be off, for I doubt I have slain the Red Comyn," "Doubt?" Kirkpatrick of Closeburn answered, "I mak sikker," ("I'll make sure," or "I make sure") and rushing into the church, finishing Comyn.

Less than seven weeks after the killing in Dumfries, Bruce was crowned King of Scotland; he granted their armorial to the Kirkpatricks. "I mak sikker" became the family motto.

== See also ==
- Clan Kirkpatrick
- Clan Kirkpatrick Society Official Website
- Clan Kirkpatrick Society on FB
