= Brodie Henderson (engineer) =

British civil engineer (1869–1936)

- Born: 6 March 1869; Ealing, Middlesex
- Died: 28 September 1936 (aged 67); Braughing, Hertfordshire
- Engineering career
- Discipline: civil engineer
- Institutions: Institution of Civil Engineers (president)
- Practice name: Livesey, Son and Henderson
- Projects: Dona Ana Bridge, Transandine Railway
- Awards: Knight Commander of the Order of Saint Michael and Saint George, Companion of the Order of the Bath

Sir Brodie Haldane Henderson, KCMG, CB (6 March 1869 – 28 September 1936) was a British civil engineer. Henderson was primarily a railway engineer who worked for many railroad corporations across South America, Australasia and Africa. He was the consultant for the Dona Ana Bridge which, when it was built in 1935, was the longest railway bridge in the world with a length of 2.24 miles (3.60 km). He volunteered for service with the Royal Engineers at the outbreak of World War I and was put in charge of railway lines used to tranposrt Allied troops and supplies. In this capacity he held the rank of a Brigadier-General of the British Army and his success in this role resulted in him being decorated by the British, French and Belgian governments.

After the war Henderson worked with the Imperial War Graves Commission, as High Sheriff of Hertfordshire in 1924 and as president of the Institution of Civil Engineers. He was an important patron of John William Waterhouse, the pre-Raphaelite painter, and was the original owner of Gather Ye Rosebuds While Ye May.

== Early life and career ==
Henderson was born on 6 March 1869 in Ealing, Middlesex to George and Eliza Henderson, his elder brother was Alexander Henderson the businessman and politician. His education was carried out in Germany, at Owens College in Manchester (now Victoria University) and at King's College London. At the age of 16 he entered into a pupillage with locomotive manufacturers Beyer, Peacock & Company before transferring to James Livesey and Son, consulting civil engineers. Some of his early projects was as assistant engineer during construction of the Algeciras Gibraltar Railway and a secondment in the civil engineer's department of the Lancashire & Yorkshire Railway.

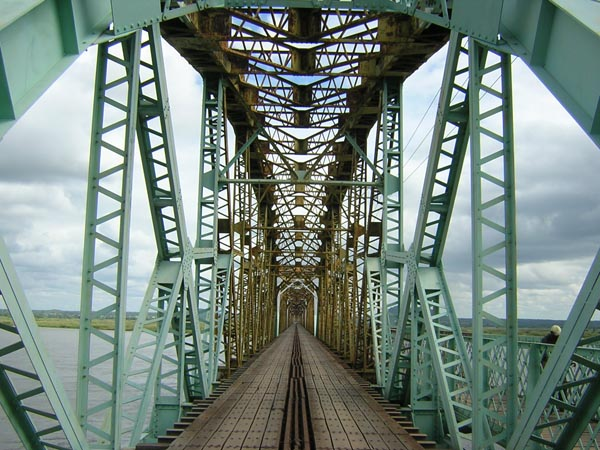
Dona Ana Bridge after conversion to a road bridge in 1995

Henderson became a partner in the firm on 6 October 1891 and it was subsequently named Livesey, Son and Henderson. He was named as senior partner in 1893. Henderson's work was largely concerned with railways, which were often financed by his brother Alexander. These included the Buenos Aires Great Southern, Central Argentine, Antofagasta and the Midland of Western Australia railways. Henderson was also responsible for the construction of new docks in Buenos Aires and projects in Spain, China and Africa.

Henderson's most famous project is the Dona Ana Bridge over the Zambezi River in Mozambique for the Beira Railroad Corporation, this bridge was built in 1935 and spanned a distance of 2.24 miles (3.60 km) by 33 separate arches. This bridge was the longest railway bridge in the world for many years. He was also responsible for the Transandine Railway which was tunnelled through the Andes Mountains between 1911 and 1925.

== Military service ==
Henderson volunteered for a commission in the Hertfordshire Yeomanry after the outbreak of World War I and was commissioned as a temporary lieutenant on 12 October 1914. He subsequently transferred to the Royal Engineers and was made the deputy director-general of transportation in Belgium and France, being chiefly concerned with railway transport He was commissioned as a temporary lieutenant-colonel and was subsequently promoted to temporary brigadier-general. During his war service he was mentioned in dispatches on four occasions.

In recognition of his war work Henderson was appointed a companion of the Order of St Michael and St George in the New Years Honours of 1918. He was appointed a commander of the Belgian Order of the Crown on 11 March 1918. He was appointed a companion of the Order of St Michael and St George in the New Years Honours of 1919, an officer in the French Légion d'honneur on 7 June 1919 and a knight commander of the Order of St Michael and St George in the King's Birthday Honours of 1919.

== Post-war work ==
After the war Henderson worked as an honorary consulting engineer to the Imperial War Graves Commission. He was also sheriff of Hertfordshire in 1922 and 1924 and High Sheriff of Hertfordshire between in 1925. Henderson was appointed deputy lieutenant of Hertfordshire on 3 December 1926. Henderson was also a justice of the peace, a governor of the Imperial College of Science and Technology and a member of the delegacy of the City and Guilds College.

Henderson had a long association with the Institution of Civil Engineers, being elected an associate member in 1894 and a full member in 1899. He was a member of its council from 1915, vice-president in 1925 and was elected president for the 1928-9 session.

== Personal life ==
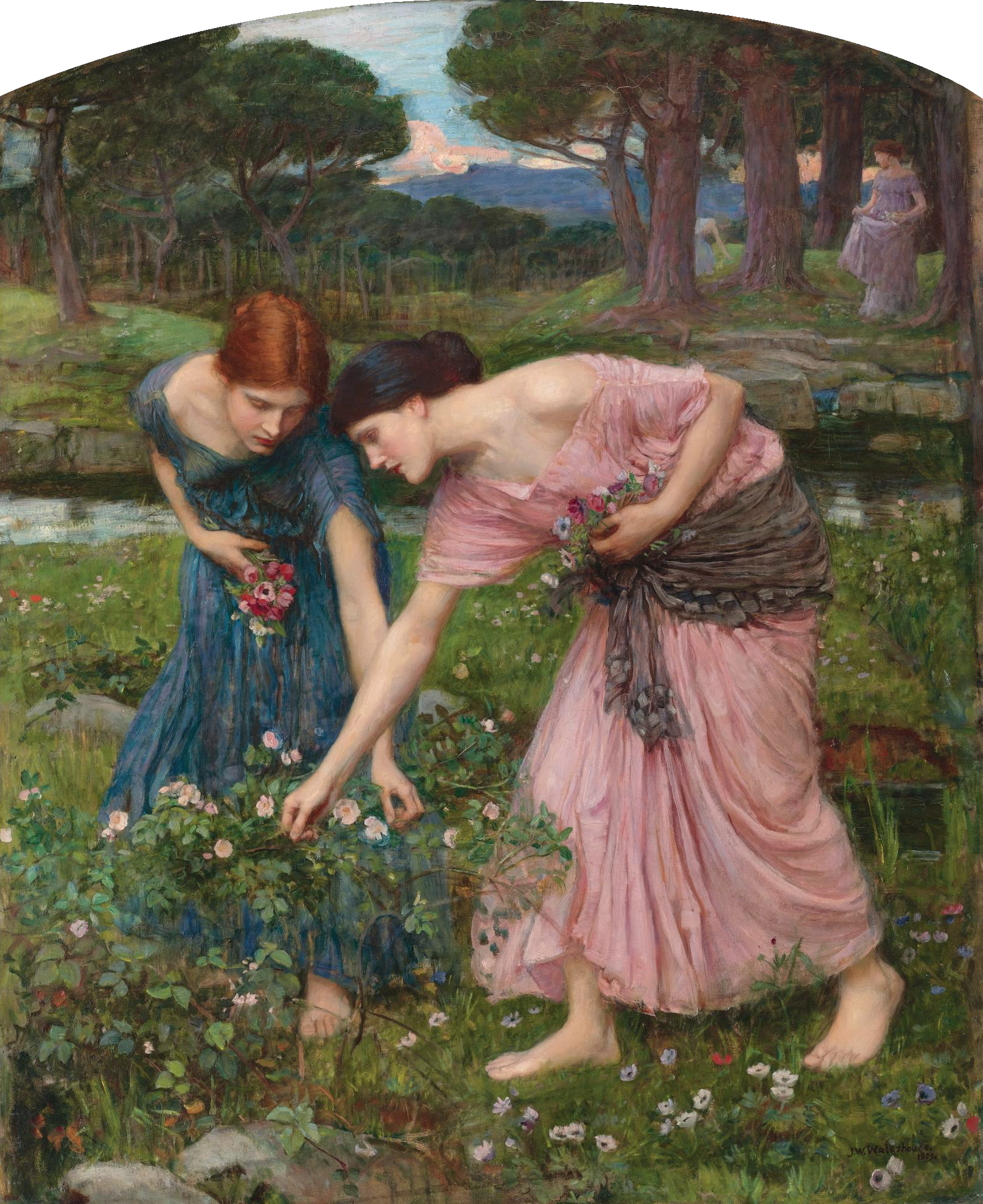
Gather Ye Rosebuds While Ye May, a Waterhouse painting owned by Henderson

Henderson became, through his brother Alexander, a patron of John William Waterhouse and owned several of his paintings. He was the original owner of Gather Ye Rosebuds While Ye May, a 1909 painting by Waterhouse that was recently valued at CAD$4.8 million to $7.3 million.

He married Ella Jones in 1901 and fathered a daughter, Joan (who married, in 1941, Sir William Strang Steel of Philiphaugh 2nd Bt and died in 1992), and three sons, Gerald, Neil and Andrew. Neil and Andrew followed their father as partners in Livesey and Henderson, as did one of Alexander's sons Philip. Andrew Henderson and Harry Livesey left the partnership on 31 March 1932.

By 1925 Henderson was living at Epping House in Little Berkhamstead. Brodie died at Upp Hall, Braughing on 28 September 1936 of lung cancer. He was cremated at Golders Green before being interred in the family grave at Braughing. A memorial service was held at St Michael's Church in the City of London.

Professional and academic associations
Preceded by Ernest Crosbie Trench	President of the Institution of Civil Engineers; November 1928 – November 1929	Succeeded by William Grierson
