= James Johnstone, 2nd Marquess of Annandale =

Kingdom of Great Britain politician (1687–1730)

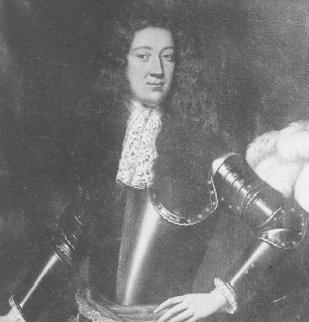
This portrait is probably of the 2nd Marquess of Annandale, though it is possibly of his father.

James Johnstone, 3rd Earl of Annandale and Hartfell and 2nd Marquess of Annandale (c.1687–1730) was a Scottish art collector and politician who sat in the British House of Commons briefly in 1708 before being disqualified as eldest son of a Scottish peer.

Johnstone was born about 1688, the eldest son of William Johnstone, 2nd Earl of Annandale and Hartfell and 1st Marquess of Annandale and his first wife Sophia Fairholm daughter of John Fairholm of Craigiehall, Linlithgow.

After the Act of Union Johnstone was returned by his father at the 1708 British general election as the Member of Parliament (MP) for both Dumfriesshire and Linlithgowshire. However he was disqualified from both seats on 3 December 1708 because he was the eldest son of a Scottish peer. He fell out with his father because he wanted to travel abroad on an allowance from his father of £400 p.a.

From 1717 to 1720 Johnstone toured the cultural sites of Italy. He succeeded his father to the title in 1721 and stood for election as a Scottish representative peer in 1722, but was defeated, possibly because of allegations of being a Jacobite. He gave up political ambitions and spent most of his adult life travelling in Italy where he amassed a great collection of art and antiquities. In 1726 he took legal action with the aim of preventing his half-brothers from inheriting his peerages and estates and directed that these should pass to his sister Henrietta Hope, Countess of Hopetoun, and her descendants.

Johnstone died in Italy in February 1730 aged 42, and his body was returned from Italy and buried in Westminster Abbey. His attempt to cut out his brothers was only partly successful, for only his Scottish lands and his art collection passed to Henrietta. His peerages, which could not be lawfully alienated in the way he intended, passed to his half-brother George who succeeded as 4th Earl of Annandale and Hartfell and 3rd Marquess of Annandale. Johnstone's portrait hangs today at Hopetoun House near Edinburgh

Parliament of Great Britain
New constituency Act of Union	Member of Parliament for Dumfriesshire; 1708 – 1708	Succeeded by William Grierson
New constituency Act of Union	Member of Parliament for Linlithgowshire; 1708 – 1708	Succeeded by John Houston
Peerage of Scotland
Preceded by William Johnstone	Marquess of Annandale; 1721–1730	Succeeded by George Vanden-Bempde
