= George Humphreys (civil engineer) =

British civil engineer

George William Humphreys
- Born: 1863; London
- Died: 1945 (aged 81–82)
- Engineering career
- Discipline: Civil
- Institutions: Institution of Civil Engineers (president)

Sir George William Humphreys KBE (1863–1945) was a British civil engineer.

Humphreys was born in London in 1863. He became a member of the Institution of Civil Engineers (ICE) on 7 March 1908. He became a member of the council of that institution in November 1917 and served as vice-president from November 1927. Humphreys was elected president of the ICE for the November 1930 to November 1931 session. After his term he returned to the council as a past-president and remained in that position until October 1937. In 1927 he was appointed a Knight Commander of the Order of the British Empire.

Humphreys held a commission as an officer in the Territorial Army's Engineer and Railway Staff Corps, an unpaid unit which provides technical expertise to the British Army. On 18 June 1932 he was promoted from lieutenant colonel to colonel. He received the Efficiency Decoration on 18 March 1937 for his volunteer army service. Humphreys was appointed a land tax commissioner for the City of Westminster and its liberties on 22 April 1938, at which time he was living in Queen Anne's Gate in Westminster. On 25 June 1938 he resigned his commission in the army, receiving permission to retain his rank and continue to wear his uniform. Humphreys died in 1945.

Professional and academic associations
Preceded by William Grierson	President of the Institution of Civil Engineers; November 1930 – November 1931	Succeeded by Cyril Kirkpatrick
