= Clan Carruthers =

Scottish Lowland clan and family

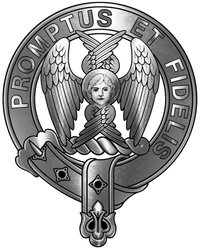
- Crest: A seraphim volant Proper
- Motto: Promptus et Fidelis (Ready and faithful)
- War cry: Holmains/We ride

Profile
- Region: The Scottish Western Marches Scottish Borders
- District: Dumfriesshire
- Plant badge: Gorse (Ulex europaeus)

Chief
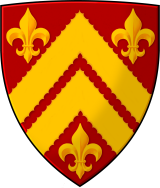
- Dr Simon Peter Carruthers of Holmains, Chief of the Name and Arms of Carruthers, 22nd of his line.
- Seat: Holmains
- Historic seat: Mouswald Tower; Holmains Towerhouse (Howmains); Kirkwood House
Clan branches
Carruthers of Mouswald (Historic Chiefs)
Carruthers of Holmains (Howmains) (Chiefs)
Carruthers of Dormont (Cadet)
Allied clans
Clan Bruce
Clan Stewart
Clan Douglas
Clan Irving of Bonshaw
Rival clans
Clan Kirkpatrick
Kindreds
All derivatives of the name Carruthers to include: Carrutherses, Caruthers, Carothers, Carrothers, Carrithers, Carithers, Corruthers, Corrithers, Crothers, Carathers, Carothers, Crouthers, Carruther, Credeur, Cardus, Carother, Carouthers, Carradice, Carrauthers, Carrederys, Carrodus, Carrotheris, Carrothorys, Carrothis, Carutherys, Caruthris Carrothyris, Carruderes, Carruderis, Carruthirs, Carruthoris, Caruderis, Caruyeris, Cerrothers, Corithers, Crathers, Cridders, Curthers, Cruthers, Carradus, Crowthers, Karruthers, Karruther amongst others

Clan Carruthers is a Lowland Scottish clan of the Scottish Borders headed by their Chief, Dr. Simon Peter Carruthers of Holmains and is recognised as such by the Lord Lyon King of Arms.

A Clan Chief of Carruthers was confirmed after over 12 years of research and investigation by the official representatives of Carruthers internationally; Clan Carruthers Society (International). This research was initiated and headed by Dr George Carruthers from Fife, formerly the Clan Convenor now the Carruthers Shennachie. He was assisted in his research by Mr Antony Maxwell, a renowned Scottish heraldist from Edinburgh. The current Clan Convenor is Capt. Michael Carruthers.

The Society is based in Annan, Scotland with regional representatives worldwide. They took the official and legal route through the auspices of the Lord Lyon King of Arms in Edinburgh to locate the senior of their line. After 20 months of analysis of the petitioned evidence and proofs, on 19 August 2019, and after over 200 years, a Chief was confirmed by the Lord Lyon.

This takes Clan Carruthers from armigerous status (without Chief) to attaining legal recognition and thus becoming a 'Noble Incorporation' in Scots law. Carruthers is now an officially recognised Scottish clan internationally with all that that entails.

== History ==
=== Origins ===
The surname of Carruthers arose in Dumfriesshire and it appears to allude to the ancient British fort called Caer Rydderch or Rythyr. The historian George Fraser Black asserted that this means fort of Rydderch, with Ryderch appearing to be a form of personal name.

In the thirteenth century the chiefly family of Carruthers of Carruthers rose to become stewards of Annandale under the Clan Bruce. The historian George Fraser Black writes of Nigel de Karruthers, a cleric who was also Rector of Ruthwell in 1380, and rose to become Canon of Glasgow Cathedral in 1351. He was also named as chancellor to Robert, High Steward of Scotland in 1344. At around the same time, 1320 the chiefly family of Carruthers acquired the lands of Musfald (now called Mouswald).

=== 16th century ===
The Carruthers of Mouswald line came to an end with Sir Simon Carruthers, 10th of Mouswald who was killed in 1548 during a border raid, and his daughters were placed under the guardianship of the Clan Douglas.

The Carruthers of Holmains line, however, continued to prosper and in 1542 their lands were erected into a free barony. John Carruthers of Howmains was indicted, along with Edward Irvine of Bonshaw (chief of Clan Irvine), for an assault on Kirkpatrick of Closeburn (chief of Clan Kirkpatrick) in 1563, as well as for slaying several other persons. In 1587 the Clan Carruthers was included on the roll of "unruly clans" in the West Marches.

=== 18th century to modern period ===
The Carruthers estate of Howmains was lost in 1772 when a financial disaster overwhelmed the family. However, in the 1500s a younger son of the family became the progenitor of the Dormont cadet line having acquired the estate in Dumfriesshire. Carruthers of Dormont still holds that estate to the present day. However, as proven descendants of Holmains line exist, it is from this line the current chief has been confirmed

A notable member of the clan was Colonel Francis Carruthers who served in Egypt and in the Boer War. From 1915 to 1919 he was assistant director at the War Office. He was also a brigadier in the Royal Company of Archers (the monarch's body guard in Scotland) as well as being Lord Lieutenant of Dumfries.

The current Chief of Clan Carruthers was confirmed on 19 August 2019 by the Lord Lyon.

== Armorial History ==
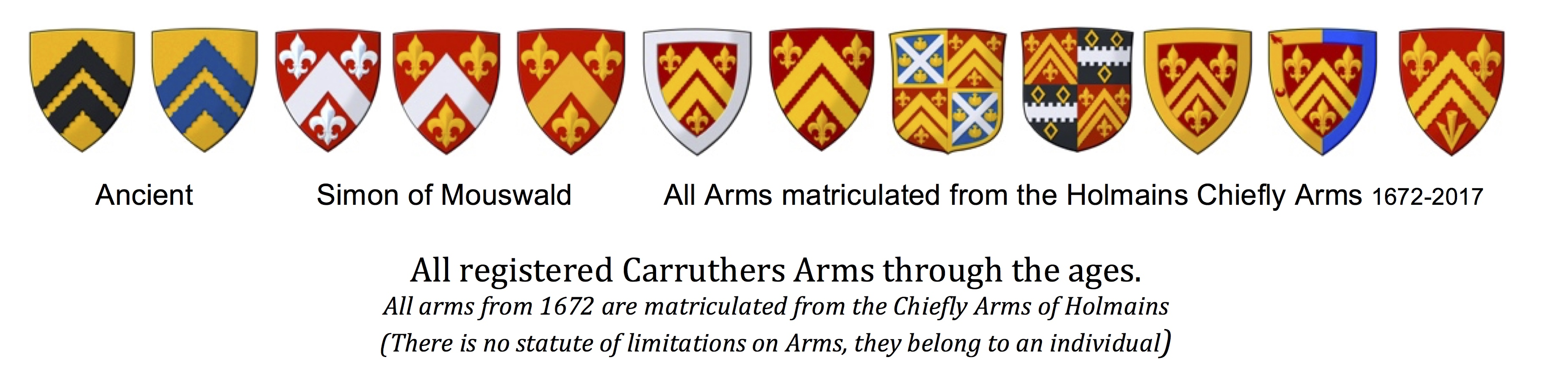

The changes to the arms and crest from the first Arms of Mouswald through to Holmains (Howmains) and Dormont to the present day show some important changes.

=== Ancient Recorded Arms of Carruthers of Carruthers ===
1) Or (gold), two chevrons engrailed Sable (black),

2) Or (gold) two chevrons engrailed Azure (blue)

=== Recorded Arms of Carruthers of Mouswald ===
3) Gules (red), a chevron between three fleur de lys Or (gold) and finally,

4) Gules (red), a chevron between three fleur de lys Argent (silver).

The first two (classed as the Ancient Arms) bore a striking resemblance to another family of the time, the McClennans and the latter two the Brownes/Brouns of Carsluith and Coulston. The suspicion is that the second shield (2) was wrongly recorded by the herald William Pont as an error in describing the colour of the chevrons as Azure rather than Sable, as in blazon #1. The Arms of Sir Simon are considered to have been used by the family prior to his blazon being recorded.

=== Recorded Arms of Carruthers of Holmains ===
The heraldic turmoil of some five centuries was finally brought to order with the passing of what is known as the Lyon Act of 1672 which required that the Scottish King of Arms, the Lord Lyon, and his heralds to keep a permanent ‘Register of All Arms and Bearings in Scotland’.

The heralds were given a year to record in the new register all arms of those entitled to bear arms and to grant or matriculate new arms to those found "virtuous and well deserving". The then Chief of the clan, John Carruthers 9th of Holmains rationalised and merged the Carruthers arms in 1672 and finalised the colours on the Chiefs arms to (Gules) red and (Or) gold. These combined the ancient arms of Carruthers and the arms of the last Mouswald Chief, Simon Carruthers, to reflect those that are recognisable as the arms of the Carruthers Chief today.

The Holmains Arms recorded in the Register, are therefore the principal and chiefly arms of the name Carruthers, currently borne by Dr Simon Carruthers of Holmains, Chief of the Name and Arms of Carruthers:

They are blazoned; Gules (red), two chevrons engrailed between three fleur de lys Or (gold),

They remain the personal and visual signature of the Chief and cannot be used without his permission.

=== Matriculation of Arms ===
As is the case of all petitions for arms from whatever family/clan, any subsequent arms granted to a Carruthers after Holmains require two distinct differences on the shield from that of the arms of the chief.

This is reflected by Carruthers of Dormont who, on registering their own arms in 1913, added a gold border around the Holmains arms. As the second difference they also used chevronels engrailed rather than the larger chevrons, while keeping the Seraphim volant proper as their crest and the clan chiefs motto of Prompts et Fidelis - Ready and Faithful.

The penultimate Carruthers Armiger granted Arms was those of the Carruthers Society Convenor registered in 2017. They followed the differences of Dormont to chevronels rather than chevrons but replaced the Fleur d-lis in the bass with a pheon (to represent the lang spear used by the Reivers), as their second difference.

The crest of these arms continues with angelic theme; the Archangel Michael pinning the beast proper with the motto individualised as; Non Sto Solus - I do not stand alone.

These arms are Blazoned: Gules, two chevronels engrailed between in chief two fleurs-de-lys and in base a pheon Or.

=== Carruthers Crests ===
To date all registered Carruthers arms have maintained an angelic figure as their crest. When reproducing the seraphim from the Chiefs crest, a face is always depicted on the seraphim along with the six wings. This mirrors the pictorial reproductions by both religious and heraldic artists through the ages when depicting a Seraphim Proper.

== Chief of Carruthers ==
Although Carruthers held the land of Carruthers itself for at least 3 generations before that, the first recognised chiefs began with Thomas Carruthers, 1st of Mouswald. For services given, Thomas received a charter of land to include Mouswald, from King Robert the Bruce in 1320.

The House of Mouswald, extending their lands over time, becoming a barony.

However, they became extinct in 1548 with the death of the then Chief, Sir Simon Carruthers 10th of Mouswald, 6th Baron, who was killed on a border raid. He left no male heir.

After Mouswald's demise, the chiefship passed to the next in line, that being the barony of Carruthers of Holmains, of which the progenitor was John Carruthers, Kings Chancellor of Annandale, younger brother of Thomas 1st Mouswald .

Holmains are the direct descendants of John Carruthers, younger brother of Thomas 1st of Mouswald.

The Holmains chiefly line continued unbroken until the death of John Carruthers, 12th of Holmains and 8th Baron, who passed in 1809. Because no one took up the mantle, the Chiefship lay dormant for 210 years.

This changed on 19 August 2019 when, after two court hearings, presided over by the Lord Lyon and a full analysis of the evidence presented before him, the Lord Lyon confirmed Dr Simon Peter Carruthers of Holmains, Chief of the Name and Arms of Carruthers.

Dr Carruthers, known as Peter, is the 4x great grandson of John 12th of Holmains and a direct descendant of the line of Carruthers going back to at least the 10th century.

Further, on 26 November 2020, the Lord Lyon granted additaments to the Arms of the Chief of Carruthers to include two fallow deer bucks Rampant as supporters on a compartment of heathland, on which is strewn gorse in flower.

To be fully confirmed Chief an inauguration must take place.

=== Chief’s Inauguration ===
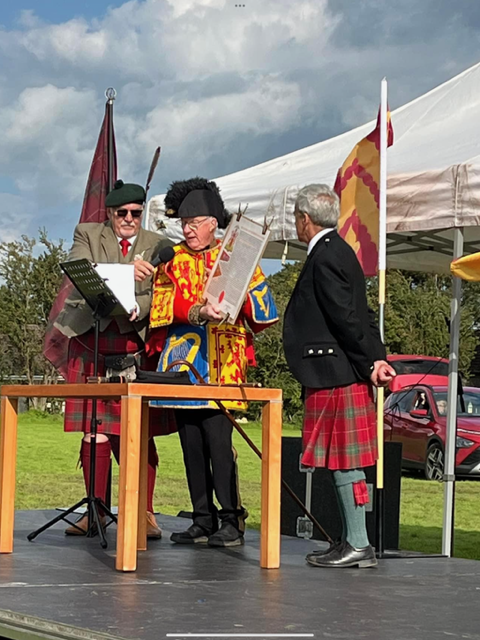
Presentation to the Chief of Carruthers the Letters Patent

On 24 August 2024, Simon Peter Carruthers was officially inaugurated as Chief of Carruthers in his Ancestral homelands of Annandale, Scotland during the Annan Festival. He was presented with his Letters Patent by Sir Crispin Agnew of Lochnaw, Albany Herald Extraordinary the representative of the Lord Lyon, King of Arms on behalf of the Sovereign.

Four symbols of his office were presented by the Shennachie, Dr George Carruthers FSA Scot, to the Chief. Those being an embossed family bible, a balmoral with three eagle feathers, a gold ring engraved with his arms and a cromach (shepherds crook). An oath of loyalty and to uphold the name of Carruthers in a manner deserving of its respect was given by the Chief to the clan and family. The Shennachie on behalf of all the elders and stewards gave an oath of fealty and loyalty to the Chief, and an oath of fealty and loyalty was then given by all members of the clan to the Chief. Carruthers giving the oath were from the local area, other parts of the UK, Africa, Australasia, Canada, Europe, and the United States of America.

After which the Reverend John Pickles, minister of the Church of Scotland for the parishes Annan, Brydekirk, Dalton and Hightae, gave readings from Psalms and the Gospel of St Luke. The Reverend led all present in prayers and according to ancient tradition as a member of the kirk, gave his blessing to the Chief and then to all those gathered.

The Shennachie invited all chiefs present to give greetings. The Chiefs of clan Irving; Rupert Irving of Bonshaw, Hunter; Madam Pauline Hunter of Hunterson, Hanney; Dr David Hanney of Kirkdale, MacArthur; John MacArthur of that Ilk and the Commander of Clan McEwen; Sir John McEwen of Marchmont and Bardrochat gave their warm best wishes and Ross McEwen Esq, FSA Scot gave greetings from the Buchanan Chief; Michael Buchanan of Buchanan. The Chief responded with kind words and best wishes to all concerned and the Shennachie closed the inauguration with an emotional statement that what he had begun in 2007 had been officially and legally completed on this day.

During the gathering afterwards, further appointments were made by the Chief onto his Council.

== Carruthers Chief, Armigers and Clansmen/Clanswomen ==
CHIEF (3 eagle feathers in bonnet)

•The Chief wears three eagle feathers on his crest sitting within a circlet on which is inscribed his motto.

CHIEF’s HEIRS (2 eagle feathers in bonnet)

• A Chief’s heir will wear two eagle feathers. They will wear two feathers on their father's crest, sitting within a circlet on which is inscribed the motto of the Chief.

CHIEFTAINS (2 eagle feathers in bonnet)

•Chieftains are officially warranted by the Chief of the clan or family and until recently they have only been recognised in very large clans such as the McLeods and MacDonalds. They can however be either hereditary or life appointments. The Chieftain wears two feathers on his crest or that of the chief, sitting within a circlet on which is inscribed their motto.

Currently, Carruthers have no Chieftains recognised by their Chief, Peter Carruthers of Holmains. However it is assumed that if a chieftain was to be warranted, the cadet branch of Carruthers of Dormont would be considered as such.

ARMIGERS (1 eagle feather in bonnet)

(Clan Armigers are those that have matriculated arms from the Lord Lyon whose arms show two differences from those of the Chief)

•An Armiger will wear one feather on his crest, sitting within a circlet on which is inscribed their personal motto or alternatively the crest and motto of the Chief.

All Armigers below are living.

1) Arms of the Chief of Carruthers (Registered by the Lord Lyon 1672)

Dr Simon Peter Carruthers of Holmains Blazon: Gules two chevrons engrailed between three fleur de lis Or supported by two fallow deer bucks rampant on a compartment of heathland on which are strewn gorse flower in bloom. Motto: Promptus et Fidelis (Ready and Faithful)

All Carruthers arms are differenced from those of the chief at least twice.

2) Bruce Mitchell-Carruthers (Registered by the Lord Lyon 1876). (Holmains-Chief's Cousins) Blazon:Quarterly 1 and 4, Gules two chevrons engrailed between three fleur-de-lis Or (Carruthers); 2 and 3 Sable, a fess counter-embattled Argent, between three mascles Or (Mitchell) Crest: Dexter - on a wreath of the liveries, a cherubs head proper. Sinister - on a wreath of the liveries, St Michael in armour holding a spear in his dexter hand, the face neck, arms and legs bare, all Proper, the wings Argent and the hair auburn. Motto/s: Promptus et Fidelis (Ready and Faithful - Carruthers) / Virtute Cresco (Growth through Virtue - Mitchell).

3) James Andrew Carruthers of Dormont (Registered by the Lord Lyon 1903). (Cadet line of Holmains) Blazon: Gules, two chevronelles engrailed between three fleur d-lis bordered Or. Crest: Seraphim Volant Proper. Motto: Promptus et Fidelis (Ready and Faithful).

4) Mr Iain Arthur Stewart Carruthers (Registered by the Lord Lyon 1965) Blazon: Gules, two chevronels engrailed between three fleurs d-lis, in a bordure per pale Or and Argent on which is placed dexter in chief a martlet and in fess a crescent gules. Motto: Promptus et Fidelis (Ready and Faithful)

5) Dr George Carruthers, FSA Scot (Registered by the Lord Lyon 2017). Blazon: Gules, two chevronelles engrailed, between two fleur d-lis in chief and a pheon in base Or. Crest: St Michael pinning the Beast Proper. Motto: Non Sto Solus (I do not stand alone).

6) Mr Gary John Carruthers, FSA Scot (Registered by the Lord Lyon 2019). Blazon: Gules two chevronels engrailed between two fleur d-lis in chief and a bell Or in base, all within a bordure quarterly of the Second and First charged in 1 and 4 with a crescent and 2 and 3 with a mullet counter-changed. Crest: Seraphim Volant Proper. Motto: Promptus et Fidelis (Ready and Faithful).

This list will be updated as new armigers matriculate arms.

Armigers are entitled to wear their own crest in a circlet, rather than belt and buckle, upon which their own motto is engraved).

The arms of an individual, to include the arms/shield of the Carruthers chief and his armigers, remain in law the visual signature and property of that person or his proven descendants.

They cannot be used without permission. Carruthers in the same vein as all other Scottish clans and families do not have ‘family’ arms.

CLANSMEN/WOMEN

Members of the clan, who do not have their own arms, will, as is the norm in Scottish clan society, wear the Chief's crest encircled by a belt and buckle on which is inscribed the motto of the Chief - Promptus et Fidelis.

In the centre of which sits the Carruthers chief’s crest; seraphim volant Proper. This crest is always depicted as six wings, the upper and lowermost wings crossed in saltire, the middle wings spread as in flight and always with an angelic face in the centre.

This follows both heraldic and religious traditions and has been part of the visual identity of Carruthers for nearly 400 years.

== Tartan ==
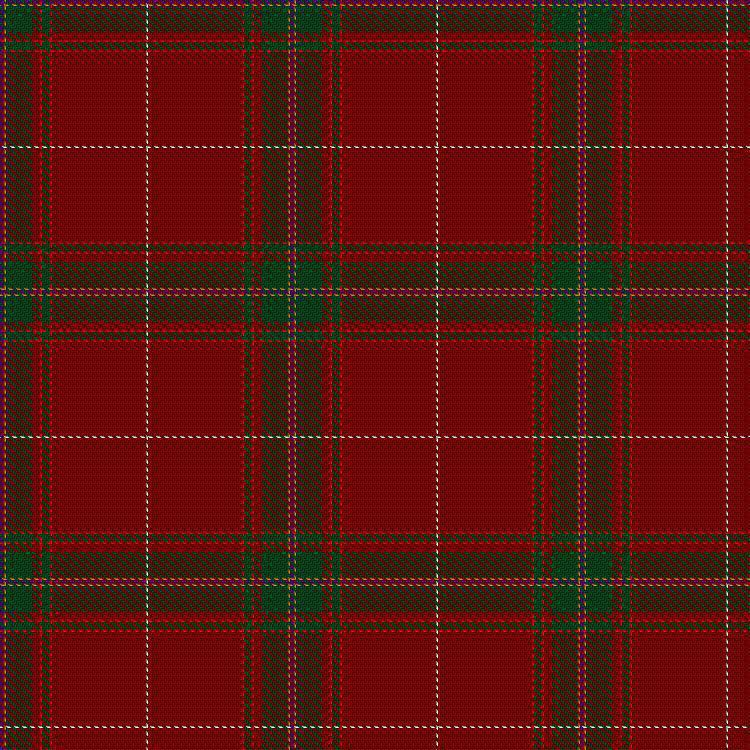
Carruthers tartan.

Historically recognised as a clan in their own right, albeit armigerous from 1809 until 2019, Carruthers are mentioned as one of the 17 lowland ‘clannis’ in the 1587 Act of the Scottish Parliament of Unruly Clans.

Since the demise of their last Chief in the 1800s, Carruthers have been considered as a sept of the family Bruce. As such they have been permitted to use their tartan. The Bruce tartan however, irrelevant of description e.g. modern, ancient, hunting or otherwise are registered and patented to that family and as such the rights of ownership belong solely to them.

As a Border Reiver (Riding Family), Carruthers never wore kilts but trews, which were far more conducive to riding on fast, sturdy horses. There was never any Carruthers tartan recognised or in fact officially registered to the name of Carruthers until 2017.

With a move towards Carruthers Clan status through the confirmation of a Chief and in order to differentiate and individualise the name, Dr George Carruthers FSA Scot from Fife had a tartan commissioned and designed based on the Bruce sett and thread count.

The colours in the design reflects the clan and family history. The green, purple and lilac represents the ancestral lands of Carruthers in Annandale, the red, the blood spilt by their Reiver ancestors in defence of their family, lands and country, while the subtle white stripe hails back to the Jacobite sympathies the family held and also to enhance their visual identity and distinguish Carruthers as a distinct border reiver clan and family in their own right.

The tartan was registered with the Scottish Tartan Register STR 11700 by Dr George Carruthers of Fife as a personal tartan open to all named Carruthers or its derivatives. In 2017, it was accepted as the official tartan of the Carruthers Clan Society.

In January 2020, the designated category of the tartan was officially changed and registered and adopted by the Chief through the auspices of the Scottish Register of Tartans as the official Clan/Family tartan of Carruthers.

The Carruthers red tartan is currently woven by the House of Edgar in Perth, Scotland and is the official tartan of Clan Carruthers. The tartan is available via the House of Edgar to all Kiltmakers worldwide.

== Clan Carruthers Society-(International) ==
In January 2017, Clan Carruthers Society (International) was founded on a Royal Charter to Holmains dated 1755. It is officially recognised by the Chief of Carruthers as the official home of our family and the only society authorised to represent the worldwide Carruthers family and clan.

It is non-commercial, apolitical and non-partisan and is open to any member of the international Carruthers family and derivatives of that name. The Society is based in the United Kingdom, but is represented by an international Executive Council.

The Society, headquartered in Scotland, has representatives in Australia (CCS-Australia and Oceania), Africa (CCS-Africa) Canada (CCS-Canada) not for profit organisation, UK (CCS-UK), Europe (CCS-Europe, Africa (CCS-Africa) and the United States of America (CCS-USA), the latter being a registered 501(c)3 organisation.

It can be found at: www.clancarrutherssociety.org

=== Clan Society Badge ===
The Clan Society's badge is the Seraphim Volant Proper, being the crest of the chief, encircled by a belt and buckle on which is inscribed his motto: Promptus et Fidelis. The Seraphim, as is the case in heraldic and religious depictions, has a face. The wearing of a Chief's crest as a badge shows a declaration of fealty and support for the Chief of Carruthers.

=== Society Function ===
The Society is non-commercial, apolitical and non-partisan and is open to any member of the international Carruthers family and derivatives of that name. The society, based in the United Kingdom is represented by an international Executive Council.

After more than 12 years, the Society were successful in their efforts to have Carruthers accepted as an official clan in their own right. This was achieved by supporting a petitioner to the Lyon Court in Edinburgh and led to the confirmation of a Dr Simon Peter Carruthers of Holmains, Chief of the Name and Arms of Carruthers, on 19 Aug 2019. He was inaugurated 22nd Chief of Carruthers on the ancestral lands on 24 August 2024 in Annan, Dumfriesshire, Scotland.
