= Kirkpatrick (disambiguation) =

Kirkpatrick is a surname and occasional given name. It may also refer to:

== United States ==
- Kirkpatrick, Indiana
- Kirkpatrick, Ohio, a village
- Kirkpatrick, Oregon, a census-designated place
- Kirkpatrick Chapel (the Sophia Astley Kirkpatrick Memorial Chapel), a college chapel located at Rutgers University in New Brunswick, New Jersey

== United Kingdom ==
- Kirkpatrick-Fleming, Scotland
  - Kirkpatrick railway station

== Antarctica ==
- Mount Kirkpatrick

== Clan Kirkpatrick ==
- Clan Kirkpatrick
