= Kilpatrick limit =

In particle accelerators, a common mechanism for accelerating a charged particle beam is via copper resonant cavities in which electric and magnetic fields form a standing wave, the mode of which is designed so that the E field points along the axis of the accelerator, producing forward acceleration of the particles when in the correct phase.

The maximum electric field $E$ achievable is limited by a process known as RF breakdown. The reliable limits for various RF frequencies $f$ were tested experimentally in the 1950s by W. D. Kilpatrick.

An approximate relation by least-square optimization of the data yields

$f = 1.64\,\mathrm{MHz} \cdot \left(\frac{E}{E_0}\right)^2 \cdot \exp\left( -8.5 \frac{E_0}{E} \right), \quad$ with $E_0 = 1 \mathrm{\frac{MV}{m}}$ (megavolts per metre).

This relation is known as the Kilpatrick Limit.
