= Ethel Kirkpatrick =

British artist

- Born: Ethel Alice Kirkpatrick; 30 November 1869; Clerkenwell, London, England
- Died: 28 December 1966 (aged 97); Middlesex, England
- Education: Royal Academy School, Central School of Arts and Crafts, Académie Julian
- Style: marine and landscape painter

Ethel Alice Kirkpatrick (30 November 1869 – 28 December 1966) was a British painter, printmaker and jeweller. She was a marine and landscape painter, mainly working in oil and watercolour but also producing woodcuts.

== Early life and training ==
Ethel Alice Kirkpatrick, was the second daughter of Mary Ann Rosa Kirkpatrick (née Marriott) and Thomas Sutton Kirkpatrick. She was born on 30 November 1869 in Clerkenwell, London. Her older sister was Ida Marion Kirkpatrick (1866– 1950), who introduced her to art.

Their father was a professional soldier from a landed family at Coolmine, Dublin, Ireland. After leaving a position in the Indian Army, he worked in the British prison service, later as governor of Exeter, Newgate and then Wormwood Scrubs prisons.

Kirkpatrick studied at the Royal Academy School and at the Central School of Arts and Crafts, where she learned enamelling and woodcutting techniques. She continued studying at the Académie Julian in Paris.

== Working life ==
Both Ethel and her older sister Ida travelled to artist’s colonies in St Ives, Cornwall and Walberswick, Suffolk. They both appear in biographical lists of Suffolk artists and Cornwall artists. After their father died in 1895 or 1896, a large art studio was built for the sisters behind their family house at Grove Hill, Harrow-on-the Hill, London, which they named "The Gables."

Kirkpatrick produced paintings and woodcut work in colour. She was a member of the Society of Graver Painters and of the Colour Woodcut Society. Colour woodcuts by her are in the collections of the National Gallery of Canada and the Victoria and Albert Museum. Both the Hunterian Museum and Art Gallery and the British Museum also hold examples of Kirkpatrick's prints in their collections.

Kirkpatrick was considered influential by many of the British colour woodcut artists working after her in the 1910s and 1920s.

== Exhibitions ==
From 1891, Kirkpatrick began exhibiting at several London galleries, such as the Alpine Club Gallery. She showed at the Royal Academy of Arts Summer Exhibitions twelve times between 1895-1941 and exhibited with the Royal Society of British Artists. In 1901, she also exhibited at the Third Exhibition of the International Society of Sculptors, Painters and Gravers in London.

Examples of her and her sister Ida's work were included in ‘Print and Prejudice: Women Printmakers, 1700-1930’, an exhibition at the Victoria and Albert Museum in London, 2022-23.

== Selected works ==
- A Summer Haze
- Becalmed
- Day Dreams
- Moonrise
- Rooks Nesting
- Phyllis

== Death ==
Kirkpatrick died on 28 December 1966 in Middlesex, England. Her sister Ida had died sixteen years previously.
