= Bill Kilpatrick =

English rugby league footballer

Personal information
- Full name: William J. Kilpatrick

Playing information
- Position: Second-row
Club
Years	Team	Pld	T	G	FG	P
1927–32	Oldham	52
Representative
Years	Team	Pld	T	G	FG	P
1930	Other Nationalities	1

William J. Kilpatrick, was a professional rugby league footballer who played in the 1920s and 1930s. He played at representative level for Other Nationalities, and at club level for Oldham.

== International honours ==
Bill Kilpatrick won a cap for Other Nationalities while at Oldham in 1930.
