= Cyril Kirkpatrick =

British civil engineer (1872–1957)

Sir Cyril Reginald Sutton Kirkpatrick (1872–1957) was a British civil engineer.

Cyril Kirkpatrick was born in London in 1872. Kirkpatrick was Chief Engineer for the Port of London and formed the engineering firm of Kirkpatrick and Partners in 1924. He served as president of the Institution of Civil Engineers between November 1931 and November 1932. Between 1938 and 1942 Kirkpatrick drew many plans to Maryport sea wall and Harbour.

Kirkpatrick's firm was also involved with the construction of concrete caissons for the Mulberry Harbours used following the Normandy Landings during the Second World War. He served as president of the Smeatonian Society of Civil Engineers in 1950.

Kirkpatrick's firm merged with Scott and Wilson to form Scott & Wilson, Kirkpatrick and Partners in 1951. This firm later became the Scott Wilson Group. which operated until 2012 as Scott Wilson group was bought out by the American Company URS. URS was known as the 2nd global "consultancy-Engineering Firm in the World".

In 2012, URS was bought out again by another American company, AECOM in 2015 who at the time was ranked 3rd globally. So, by buying URS, they become ranked 1st Engineering Consultants Firm in the world. AECOM projects are worldwide.

Professional and academic associations
Preceded by George Humphreys	President of the Institution of Civil Engineers; November 1931 – November 1932	Succeeded by Murdoch MacDonald
