= William Grierson (engineer) =

British civil engineer (1863–1935)

A 1924 portrait of Grierson

William Wylie Grierson CBE (9 December 1863 – 14 March 1935) was a British civil engineer.

Grierson was born to James Grierson (Manager of the Great Western Railway) and Margaret Emily Grierson and was educated at Rugby School. William married Aleen Isabel Bell on 14 September 1927 at St. Paul's Church, Knightsbridge.

He joined the Great Western Railway as a pupil of William Dean, Locomotive and Carriage Superintendent at Swindon, and was the articled to William George Owen, Chief Engineer. In 1877 he entered the engineering department and was resident engineer on the Tetbury branch line. He was also involved in the widening between Pangbourne and Didcot, the extension of the Carmarthen and Cardigan line, and the construction of the South Wales and Bristol direct railway which afforded an alternative route from London to Bristol via Badminton. The work of construction occupied seven years and cost over £1m. The tunnel under the Cotswold Hills between Badminton and Chipping Sodbury was 2½ miles in length.

In 1903 he was appointed Divisional Engineer at Wolverhampton, but did not take up the position, as in the meantime he was nominated to succeed James Inlgis who had been promoted to General Manager. On the retirement of the new works engineer in July 1916, he became Chief Civil Engineer, a position he held until 1923. On retirement in 1923 he established an engineering consultancy firm.

He was appointed a Commander of the Order of the British Empire in the 1918 New Year Honours for his efforts during the First World War.

Grierson acted as chairman of the Committee on the Standardization of Railway Track and Equipment in the period 1918-1924, established in the lead-up to and after UK railway grouping and involving the chief engineers of the principal railway companies.

He served as president of the Institution of Civil Engineers from 1929 to 1930. He also served in the Engineer and Railway Staff Corps, a Territorial Army unit whose members volunteer advice to the army on engineering matters.

He died suddenly in San Remo, Italy on 14 March 1935 after an operation.

== See also ==
- Clan Grierson

Professional and academic associations
Preceded by Brodie Henderson	President of the Institution of Civil Engineers; November 1929 – November 1930	Succeeded by George Humphreys
Preceded by James Charles Inglis	Chief Engineer of the Great Western Railway; 1903–1923	Succeeded by John Christian Lloyd and William Waddell (joint)
