= Clan Grierson =

Scottish clan

Grierson
- Crest: A fetterlock Argent
- Motto: Hoc securior

Profile
- Region: Lowlands
- District: Dumfriesshire
- Plant badge: Bluebell flowers, (campanula rotundifolia) being the proper plant badge of the name Grierson have long been symbolic of humility, constancy, gratitude and everlasting love.

Chief
- Sarah Grierson of Lag,
- Chief of the Name and Arms of Grierson.
- Historic seat: Lag Tower
Septs of Grierson
Greer, Greerson, Grier
Allied clans
Clan Maxwell
Rival clans
Clan Johnstone

Clan Grierson is a Lowlands Scottish Clan.

== History ==
=== Origins of the Clan ===
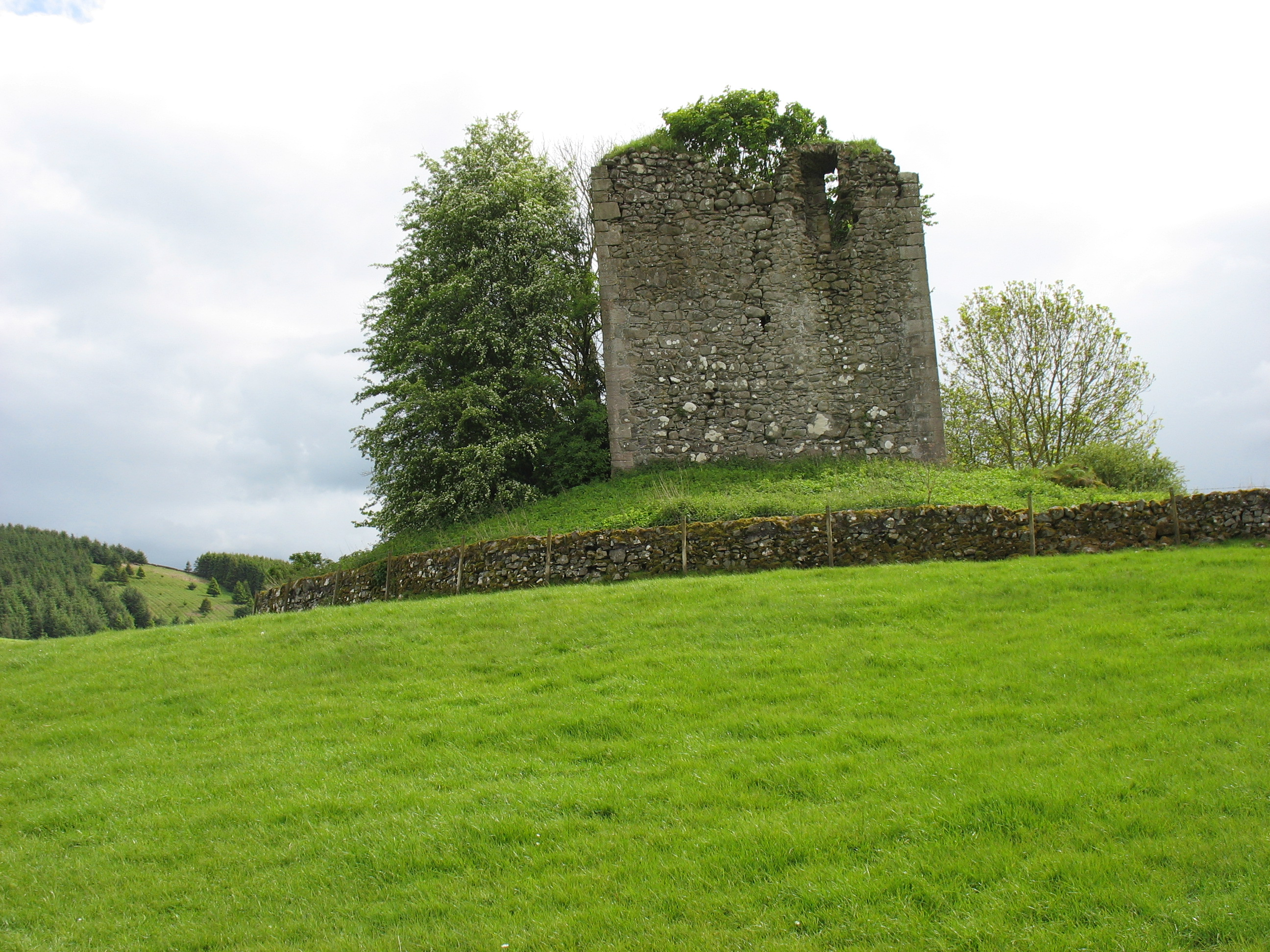
The ruins of Lag Tower, historic seat of the chiefs of Clan Grierson.

The personal name Gregor comes from the Greek for vigilant, through its Latin translation of gregorious. The name was popular amongst clergy in the Middle Ages. It is from this forename that the surname of Grierson is believed to be derived. It has been conjectured that the Grierson family come from the same stock as the Clan Gregor, although this theory has been refuted by modern historians and there is no evidence to support it.

The surname Grierson is a modern spelling of the medieval (circa 1408) surname Grerson.

In about 1408 the Griersons acquired the lands of Lag, which became the principal seat of the clan chiefs. Gilbert Grierson is described in a charter dating from 1420 as armour bearer to the Earl of Douglas. Gilbert married Janet, daughter of Sir Simon Glendinning, whose mother was Mary Douglas, daughter of the fourth Earl of Douglas and Princess Margaret. These royal connections secured the early fortunes of the Griersons. In 1460 Vedast Grierson built a strong tower at Lag.

=== 15th and 16th century conflicts ===
Vedast Grierson's son, Roger, obtained a royal charter confirming his lands in 1473. However Roger was later killed at the Battle of Sauchieburn in 1488. The Grierson Lairds of Lag also followed James IV of Scotland to the Battle of Flodden in 1513 where they met the same fate as the king.

During the wars surrounding Mary, Queen of Scots the Griersons declared for James VI of Scotland in the confrontation between the Queen and the Protestant lords.

Chief William Grierson of Lag was allied to the powerful Clan Maxwell and joined forces with them against the Clan Johnstone at the Battle of Dryfe Sands in 1593.

=== 17th and 18th centuries ===
William Grierson of Lag was knighted by James VI in 1608. His son was Sir Robert Grierson who was succeeded by his cousin, another Robert Grierson. This Robert Grierson became the first Baronet of Lag. This Robert Grierson for a time made the name of Grierson synonymous with terror and death throughout the south and west of Scotland, with his persecution of the Covenanters during the reign of James VII of Scotland. He was created a Baronet of Nova Scotia in March 1685. In that same year he surprised an illegal Covenanter service at Kirkconnel and in the ensuing struggle most of the worshipers were killed and Grierson of Lag refused to give them a decent burial which earned him his feared reputation. Amongst the Covenanter martyrs was John Bell of Whiteside. Bell's stepfather was the Viscount Kenmure who was with John Graham of Claverhouse when they encountered Sir Robert Grierson and a quarrel broke out. Kenmure drew his sword but Claverhouse dissuaded him from fighting a duel.

Kenmore made an alliance with the Douglas Duke of Queensberry by marrying the Duke's sister, Lady Henrietta Douglas and not surprisingly the Griersons did not support the Glorious Revolution, considering William of Orange and his wife Mary to be usurpers. In 1689 Sir Robert Grierson was arrested and held in prison until a substantial cash surety was paid. He was later imprisoned on two more occasions, including for being accused of counterfeiting money but was cleared of all the allegations. He died in 1736 but secured immortality in Sir Walter Scott's novel Redgauntlet. He was succeeded by his son, Sir William Grierson, 2nd Baronet who died just four years later and was in turn succeeded by his brother, Sir Gilbert Grierson. His son was William Grierson who was a close friend of Sir Walter Scott.

=== 19th and 20th centuries ===
William's eldest son was Thomas Grierson, a soldier who distinguished himself at the Siege of Delhi in 1857 but died of wounds received there. Sir Alexander Grierson, 8th Baronet of Lag was commissioned into the 78th Ross-shire Highlanders regiment.

During World War I, Sir Robert Grierson, 10th Baronet of Lag served in the King's Own Scottish Borderers, however by this time most of the Grierson lands had been lost, although the ruins of Lag Tower still stand today.

George Abraham Grierson was a distinguished linguist who devoted much of his life to the study of dialects from the Indian sub-continent. John Grierson is widely regarded as the father of the British documentary film movement.

== Clan Chief ==
The current Chief of the Name and Arms of the Grierson family, is Sarah Grierson of Lag, the first female to hold this role.

The crest badge of the Griersons contains the Latin motto: Hoc Securior which may be translated as "Safer by This".

== See also ==
- Grierson (name)
- Grierson Baronets, of Lag
- Sir Robert Grierson, 1st Baronet (Auld Lagg)
- Sir William Grierson, 2nd Baronet
- Brigadier General Benjamin Grierson
- Cecilia Grierson
- Dumfriesshire, Scotland
- Clan MacGregor
- Grierson's Raid
