= Darrell Grierson =

English footballer

Personal information
- Full name: Darrell Philip Grierson
- Date of birth: 13 October 1968 (age 58)
- Place of birth: Blackpool, England
- Position: Goalkeeper

Senior career*
| Years | Team | Apps | (Gls) |
| 1986–1987 | Tranmere Rovers | 4 | (0) |
- * Club domestic league appearances and goals

Darrell Philip Grierson (born 13 October 1968) is an English footballer, who played as a goalkeeper in the Football League for Tranmere Rovers.
