= William Kirkpatrick =

William Kirkpatrick may refer to:

- William Kirkpatrick (East India Company officer) (1754–1812), British officer and diplomat in India, known also as an orientalist
- William Kirkpatrick (New York politician) (1769–1832), United States Representative from New York
- William Sebring Kirkpatrick (1844–1932), Republican member of the U.S. House of Representatives from Pennsylvania
- William J. Kirkpatrick (1838–1921), American hymnwriter and music publisher
- William T. Kirkpatrick (1848–1921), Irish tutor and headmaster
- William Kirkpatrick (British Army officer) (1852–1931), British Army officer
- William Huntington Kirkpatrick (1885–1970), Republican member of the U.S. House of Representatives from Pennsylvania
- William Kirkpatrick (Conservative politician) (1878–1953), British Conservative Party politician, MP 1931–1936
- William Kirkpatrick (Scottish MP) (c. 1705–1778), Member of Parliament for Dumfries Burghs, 1735–1738
