= Robin Kilpatrick =

Scottish footballer

Personal information
- Full name: William Robin Kilpatrick
- Place of birth: Scotland
- Position: Outside left

Youth career
- Neilston Waverley

Senior career*
Years	Team	Apps	(Gls)
1962–1964	Queen's Park	40	(4)
1964–1965	Partick Thistle	10	(2)

International career
1964	Scotland Amateurs	2	(0)
- * Club domestic league appearances and goals

William Robin Kilpatrick is a Scottish retired amateur football outside left who played in the Scottish League for Queen's Park and Partick Thistle. He was capped by Scotland at amateur level.
