= J. Max Kilpatrick =

American judge and politician (1945–2024)

Judge, 6th district of the Mississippi Chancery Court
- In office July 1, 2005 – June 30, 2010
- Governor: Haley Barbour
- Preceded by: Edward C. Prisock
- Succeeded by: D. Joseph Kilgore

Member of the Mississippi House of Representatives from the 26th district
- In office January 1972 – 1980

Personal details
- Born: Johnnie Max Kilpatrick; January 24, 1945 Philadelphia, Mississippi, U.S.
- Died: December 10, 2024 (aged 79) Philadelphia, Mississippi, U.S.
- Spouse: Kathy House Kilpatrick
- Children: 3
- Education: Mississippi State University (BSc); University of Mississippi School of Law (JD)
- Profession: Lawyer

Military service
- Branch/service: National Guard
- Years of service: Unknown (26 years)
- Rank: Major
- Unit: Mississippi

Johnnie Max Kilpatrick (January 24, 1945 – December 10, 2024) was an American judge and politician. He served as judge to the 6th district of the Mississippi Chancery Court from 2005 until his retirement in 2010. Previously, Kilpatrick was a member of the Mississippi House of Representatives from 1972 until 1980.

== Early life and education ==
Kilpatrick was born in Philadelphia, Mississippi, on January 24, 1945, to Johnnie and Desma Kilpatrick. He had two siblings, Linda and Gerald.

Kilpatrick graduated from Philadelphia High School in 1963. He attended Mississippi State University, obtaining a bachelor of science in accounting. Kilpatrick later attended the University of Mississippi School of Law, graduating with a Juris Doctor degree in 1973.

== Career ==
=== State politics ===
Kilpatrick served in the Mississippi House of Representatives from the 26th district, which covers Leake County and Neshoba County, from January 1972 until 1980.

=== Local politics ===
Upon graduation in 1973, Kilpatrick started law practice in Philadelphia, Mississippi. He served as the District Attorney of the Mississippi 8th Judicial District (Mississippi Circuit Courts) in 1980. Kilpatrick also served as Board Attorney of the Neshoba County Board of Supervisors for 17 years.

Kilpatrick was appointed to succeed Edward C. Prisock as judge to the 6th district of the Mississippi Chancery Court by Governor Haley Barbour, taking office on July 1, 2005. He was reelected in November 2006, for a 4-year term. Kilpatrick retired from the position in May 2010, effective June 30. During his tenure, he swore in James Young, the first African-American mayor of Philadelphia, Mississippi. Kilpatrick was succeeded by D. Joseph Kilgore.

As a member of The Mississippi Bar from 1973, Kilpatrick continued law practice, serving as a referee to the Juvenile court of Kemper County until his retirement from the position in 2022.

=== Other ventures ===
In addition to law and politics, Kilpatrick served in the Mississippi National Guard for 26 years, retiring with the rank Major.

== Controversies ==
In 2008, Kilpatrick ruled that Mississippi's price gouging law was unconstitutional, rejecting Jim Hood's claims. Hood had sued the Louisville, Mississippi gas company Fair Oil Co. in 2007, accusing them of price gouging in the aftermath of Hurricane Katrina in 2005. After an appeal hearing in 2010, Kilpatrick's ruling was overturned unanimously in 2011.

== Personal life and death ==
Kilpatrick was married to Kathy House Kilpatrick and had three children, along with a step-child. His daughter, Amy, also served as a referee to the Juvenile court of Kemper County.

Kilpatrick died in Philadelphia, Mississippi, on December 10, 2024, at the age of 79.
