= Conilee Kirkpatrick =

American engineer

Conilee Gay Kirkpatrick (born 1948) is an American electronics engineer.

== Education and career ==
Kirkpatrick graduated from Washington University in St. Louis in 1969 and earned a PhD at the University of Illinois Urbana-Champaign in 1974, with the dissertation Photoluminescence from Ion Implanted Silicon. She worked for General Electric on storage tube technology in the 1970s, and became director of advanced technology implementation for Rockwell International's Microelectronics R&D Center. As a senior scientist at Science Applications International Corporation, she developed an artificial neural network on an integrated circuit, to be used as an AI accelerator. She later became a vice president of HRL Laboratories, and a member of the National Materials Advisory Board of the National Research Council.

Along with her professional work in engineering, Kirkpatrick has been active in mentoring Southern California middle-school girls in engineering.

== Recognition ==
Kirkpatrick was named a Fellow of the IEEE in 1998, "for leadership in development and manufacturing of III-V electronic materials and devices and their application to military and commercial systems".
