= Jim Kirkpatrick (footballer) =

Scottish footballer

Personal information
- Full name: James Kirkpatrick
- Date of birth: 1903
- Place of birth: Annan, Scotland
- Height: 5 ft 7 in (1.70 m)
- Position: Defender

Senior career*
Years	Team	Apps	(Gls)
- Annan
- Queen of the South
- Workington
1925–1926	Leeds United	10	(0)
1927	Watford	9	(0)
- Solway Star
- * Club domestic league appearances and goals

James Kirkpatrick (1903 – after 1926) was a Scottish professional footballer who played in the English Football League for Leeds United and Watford.
