= Grierson baronets =

Dormant baronetcy in the Baronetage of Nova Scotia

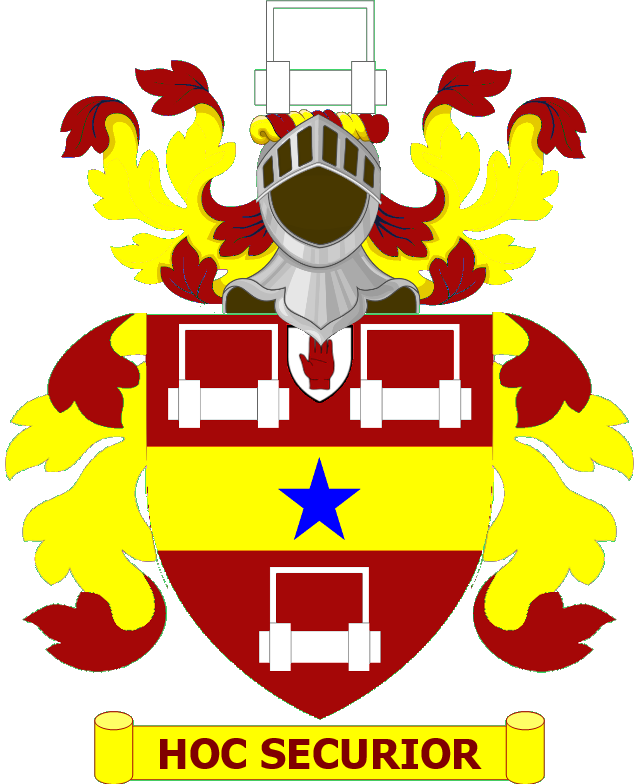
- Crest: A lock as in the arms.
- Shield: Gules on a fess Or between three quadrangular locks (or fetterlocks) Argent a mullet Azure.
- Motto: Hoc Securior

The Grierson Baronetcy, of Lag in the County of Dumfries, is a dormant title in the Baronetage of Nova Scotia. It was created on 25 March 1685 for Robert Grierson, Member of the Scottish Parliament for Dumfries and notorious persecutor of the Covenanters, with remainder to heirs male whatsoever. The baronets owned Lag Castle and Rockhall Tower.

== Grierson baronets, of Lag (1685) ==
- Sir Robert Grierson, 1st Baronet (c. 1657 – 29 December 1733)
- Sir William Grierson, 2nd Baronet (1677–1760)
- Sir Robert Grierson, 3rd Baronet (1700 – December 1765)
- Sir Gilbert Grierson, 4th Baronet (13 February 1698 – 7 February 1766)
- Sir Robert Grierson, 5th Baronet (c.1738 – 8 August 1839)
- Sir Alexander Gilbert Grierson, 6th Baronet (5 March 1777 – 14 March 1840)
- Sir Richard Grierson, 7th Baronet (10 June 1803 – 5 May 1846)
- Sir Alexander William Grierson, 8th Baronet (7 August 1806 – December 1879)
- Sir Alexander Davidson Grierson, 9th Baronet (30 November 1858 – 1 April 1912)
- Sir Robert Gilbert White Grierson, 10th Baronet (27 September 1883 – 16 June 1957)
- Sir Richard Douglas Grierson, 11th Baronet (25 June 1912 – 5 May 1987)
- Sir Michael John Bewes Grierson, 12th Baronet (24 July 1921 – 24 March 2008)

The baronetcy is considered dormant.

== See also ==
- Clan Grierson
