= Sir Robert Grierson, 1st Baronet =

Scottish nobleman who persecuted Presbyterians in the 17th century

Sir Robert Grierson of Lag
- 1st Baronet, of Lag and Rockhall
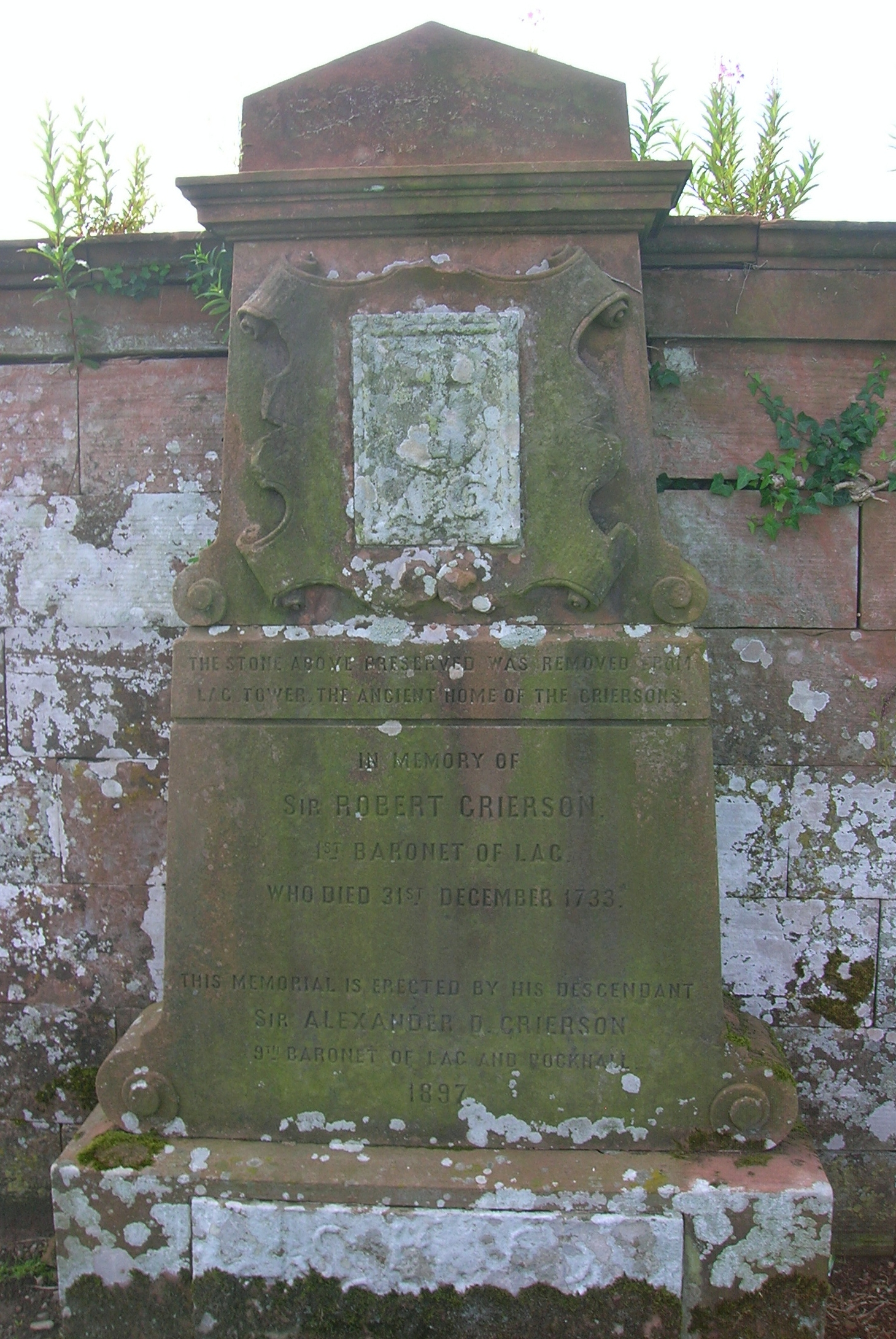
- Cruel Lag's memorial at the Old Kirk of Dunscore burial ground, erected in 1897 by his descendant Sir Alexander Grierson.
- Other names: Cruel Lag, Auld Lag
- Born: 1657; Barquhar, Lochrutton parish, Kirkcudbrightshire
- Died: 29 December 1733 (aged 75–76); Dumfries
- Buried: Dunscore Old Kirk
- Spouse: Lady Henrietta Douglas
- Parents: William Grierson, Margaret Douglas
- Occupation: Justice of the Peace, Member of Parliament

Sir Robert Grierson, 1st Baronet of Lag (1655 – 31 December 1733) was a Scottish baronet from Dumfriesshire.

He is best remembered as a notorious persecutor of the Covenanters, particularly among the people of Galloway, and is still referred to by nickname, "Cruel Lag".

The character of Sir Robert Redgauntlet of "Wandering Willie's Tale" in Sir Walter Scott's Redgauntlet is based on Grierson.

== Personal life ==
Robert Grierson was born in 1655 at the farm of Barquhar, in Dumfries, Scotland. His parents were William Grierson (1626–1666), laird of Barquhar, Kirkcudbright, Scotland, the 1st Tutor of Lag, and his wife, Margaret Douglas (b. 1633). His maternal grandfather was Sir James Douglas, of Mouswald, Dumfriesshire.

The Griersons claimed descent from Malcolm MacGregor of Glenorchy. MacGregor was supposedly a key ally of Robert the Bruce, resulting in claims that Henry II Sinclair, Earl of Orkney, granted him the lands of Lag in Dumfriesshire in 1408. There is no evidence to support such a claim and those Griersons who have undergone Y-DNA testing do not share any relevant markers with the MacGregors. Griersons carry the Haplogroup R-M222+ which has now been refined to R-FGC4125. Descent from the MacGregors is a genetic impossibility.

In 1666, Robert Grierson succeeded his cousin as laird of Lag and he acted as Steward of Kirkcudbright for a number of years.

On 21 September 1676, he married Henrietta Douglas (1657- 15 April 1736), daughter of Sir James Douglas, 2nd Earl of Queensberry, and Lady Margaret Stewart, at Drumlanrig Castle in Dumfrieshire, Scotland.

Lady Henrietta's maternal grandparents were Sir John Stewart, 1st Earl of Traquair, and Catharina Carnegie.

Robert and Henrietta had five children: William, James, John, Gilbert and Henrietta.

== Politics ==
Grierson sat as a Member of Parliament for Dumfriesshire between 1678 and 1686.

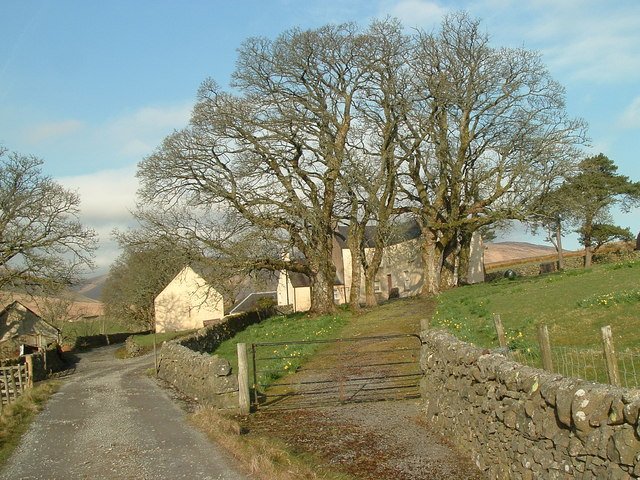
The farm of Garryhorn in Carsphairn parish, one of the lands belonging to Grierson of Lag's estate, and which was used by him and his dragoons as a base from which to conduct their searches for illegal conventicles.

Between the 1660s and 1680s the Stuart king Charles II acted to suppress dissent among the militant Presbyterians of Galloway, who refused to conform to the king's authority and in several cases broke out into armed rebellion. The local heritors were charged with enforcing this policy, and Lag, a Stuart loyalist and Episcopalian, proved a particularly energetic supporter. In 1678 he made his own tenants sign a bond in which they agreed not to attend illegal conventicles or to commune with "vagrant preachers". He subsequently assisted John Graham of Claverhouse in policing the south-west of the country. As a commissioner for Galloway he was given control of one of the military courts set up to try rebellious Covenanters, and in this capacity was responsible for several executions of those refusing to take the oaths of loyalty to the monarch; he also gained a reputation, at least among subsequent martyrologists, of having a particularly contemptuous attitude towards those before the courts, and of invariably denying his victims' requests for a prayer before punishment. Most traditions make Grierson the presiding officer at the court that condemned the "Wigtown Martyrs", Margaret Wilson and Margaret McLachlan, in May 1685. A Cloud of Witnesses, the principal martyrology of the time, charged him with command of the troop of dragoons that shot John Bell of Whiteside along with four others in Tongland Parish in February 1685, and David Halliday and George Short in Twynholm later in the year.

In 1685, after the accession of King James II and VII, Grierson was created a Baronet, of Lag, in the Baronetage of Nova Scotia, and awarded a pension.

Subsequent to the 1688 Glorious Revolution, Lag was arrested in May 1689 as a supporter of the old Stuart regime. Although he obtained his release on a substantial bail, and continued to receive his pension from William III, he remained under suspicion as a potential Jacobite rebel and was imprisoned again several times during the 1690s. In 1696 he was charged with being involved with the coining of false money at his mansion, Rockhall Tower, but it was eventually discovered that the house was merely being used for experiments in stamping linen with decorative patterns. For much of the remainder of his life Lag's fortunes were seriously impacted by fines, and he took no further part in the politics of the period. He continued to serve as a Justice of the peace and permitted his sons to become involved in the 1715 Jacobite Rising. However, the family's status never came under real threat as their connections with the influential Duke of Queensberry, both by blood and by marriage, probably served to protect them to some extent. Although Lag lived on unmolested in semi-retirement he remained feared and reviled by Covenanters: the writer Patrick Walker (c.1666-1745) in his Remarkable Passages of the Life and Death of Mr. Alexander Peden, described him as "a great persecutor, a great swearer, a great whorer, blasphemer, drunkard, liar and cheat, and yet out of hell".

In 1713 Lag handed over his estates to his eldest son, William, in return for a life rent. The two subsequently fell out over Lag's request to sell some of the property, though the resulting legal cases had the unintended effect of protecting the estates from forfeiture after William became involved in the 1715 rebellion. It was noted that father and son had been "thoroughly reunited by the common cause of retrieving their property", and Lag was eventually able to transfer the estates back to William in 1725.

== Death and posthumous legends ==
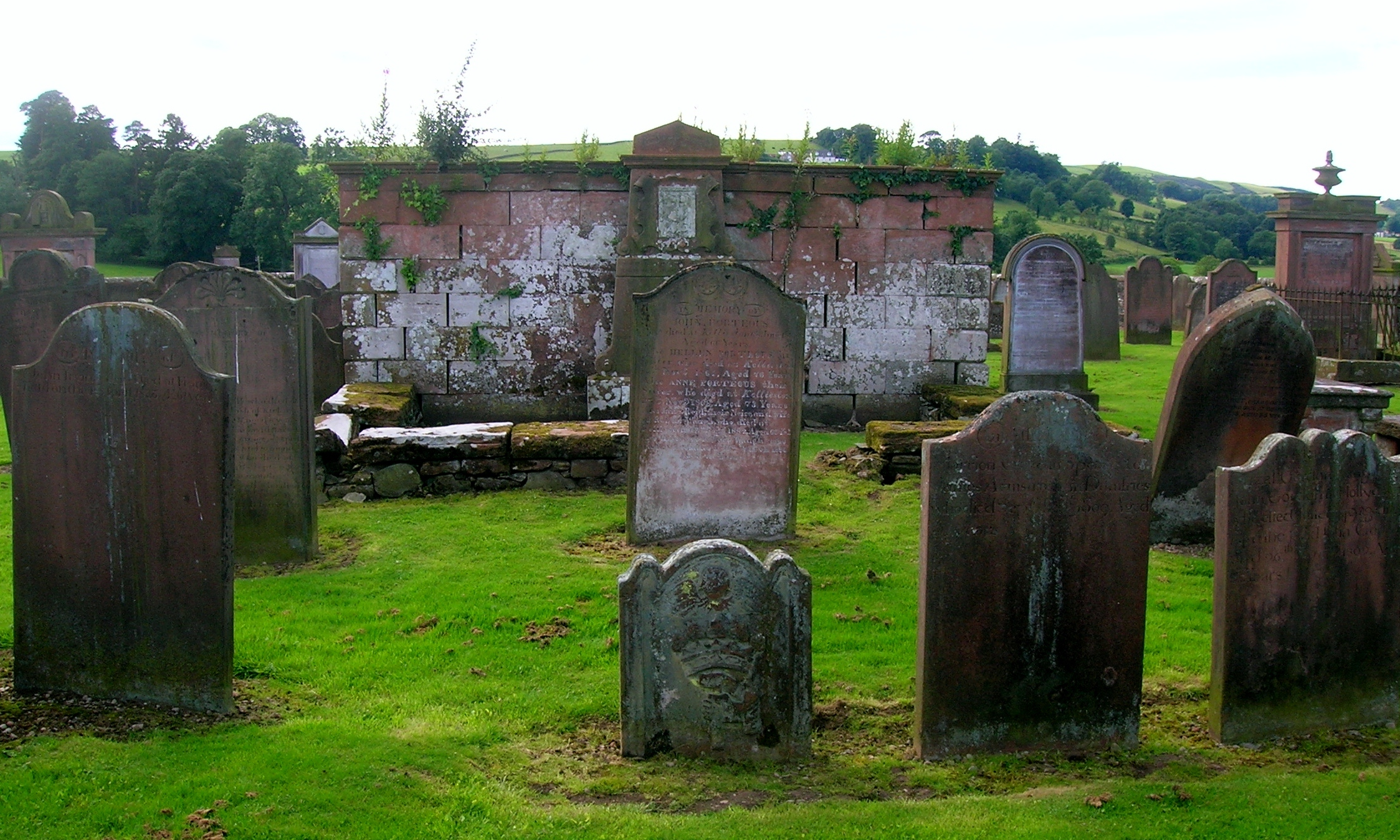
Laird of Lag's Tomb, near Farthingwell

Grierson of Lag was a byword for evil among the common Presbyterian folk in Annandale, who gravely asserted that he, like the other persecutors of the Covenanters, had intimate dealings with the devil, and that he was "partly in hell" before his death, in evidence of which they told that his saliva burnt holes where it fell, and his feet put into cold water made it boil. Lag died, aged 77, at his town house in Dumfries on 31 December 1733. He was buried two days later in the Grierson family burial plot in Old Dunscore Churchyard, the cost of the funeral being £240 Scots. A story was told that on the night he died a chariot surrounded by thunder clouds swept his soul away to hell. Another described how the horses pulling his hearse to Dunscore churchyard died of exhaustion on the way and a black raven flew down and settled on the coffin, flying away only at the moment of burial. The antiquary Charles Kirkpatrick Sharpe claimed that the story regarding the horses was in fact true, and that his grand-uncle Sir Thomas Kirkpatrick, a nephew of Lag's, had both attended the funeral and supplied the horses which subsequently died. Whereas the Presbyterian martyrologists had listed the names of those shot at the hands of Lag's men, the tales that grew up after his death became more lurid, and in later years locals pointed out a spot on Halliday Hill, near Lag Tower, where the Laird was said to have rolled Covenanters downhill in a barrel filled with spikes.

Such stories may not be the stuff of scholarly history, but they vividly demonstrate the loathing and fear in which this man was held by those who were loyal to the National Covenant (1638) and the Solemn League and Covenant (1643) and who hoped, sometimes schemed and even at times took up arms against the Stuart monarchy to achieve religious freedom. A satirical chapbook poem known as "Lag's Elegy", in which the Devil lamented the death of Lag, his "champion brave", was extremely popular in southern Scotland for around fifty years after his death.

Grierson eventually entered folk memory, and was the subject of a strange custom recorded in Galloway and Dumfriesshire in the 19th century. Alexander Fergusson, who published a biographical sketch of him in 1886, recalled that as late as the 1840s some families, including Fergusson's own, used to commemorate Lag's deeds yearly in November by getting someone to dress as the "Laird of Lag", a "beast as hideous as the ingenuity of the performer intrusted with the part could make it" and which was used to frighten the children of the household. The conventional "beast" walked on all fours and had a long snout made from a large wooden kitchen pestle, with which the performer would "smell out Covenanters under the sideboard and other likely places": Fergusson said that anything "more striking, not to say appalling, to young minds can hardly be imagined".

== Arms ==
Coat of arms of Sir Robert Grierson, 1st Baronet
Crest A lock as in the arms. Escutcheon Gules on a fess Or between three quadrangular locks (or fetterlocks) Argent a mullet Azure. Motto Hoc Securior

Baronetage of Nova Scotia
New creation	Baronet (of Lag); 1685–1733	Succeeded by William Grierson
