= John Grierson (Dominican) =

John Grierson or Grisson (died 1564) was a Scottish Dominican and perhaps a member of the family of Grierson of Lag in Dumfriesshire.

== Biography ==
Grierson was a student of the university of Aberdeen, and in 1500 was principal of the King's College at that university. Previously to 1517 he became prior of the Dominican house at St. Andrews, and rose to be provincial of his order in Scotland before 1528. In 1542 he is described as doctor of divinity, provincial, and prior of St. Andrews; he resigned the priory before 1552. He was certainly alive in 1559, and is said to have survived till 1564. Echard says that he remained a firm Roman Catholic, and defended his faith by word and by deed.

== Works ==
According to Dempster, Grierson wrote:

- ‘De Miseria profitentium fidem et Religionem Catholicam in Scotia.’
- ‘De casu Ordinis sui, et paupertate.’

Some letters which are preserved in R. F. Plaudius's history of the order. But Echard says that he had searched in vain for these letters, and it is possible that Grierson left no writings.
