= Sir William Grierson, 2nd Baronet =

Scottish Jacobite and Tory politician

Sir William Grierson, 2nd Baronet (c. 1677 – 1760), of Rockhall, Lag, Dumfries, was a Scottish Jacobite and Tory politician who sat in the House of Commons from 1709 to 1711. He was captured and imprisoned in the 1715 Jabobite rebellion.

== Biography ==
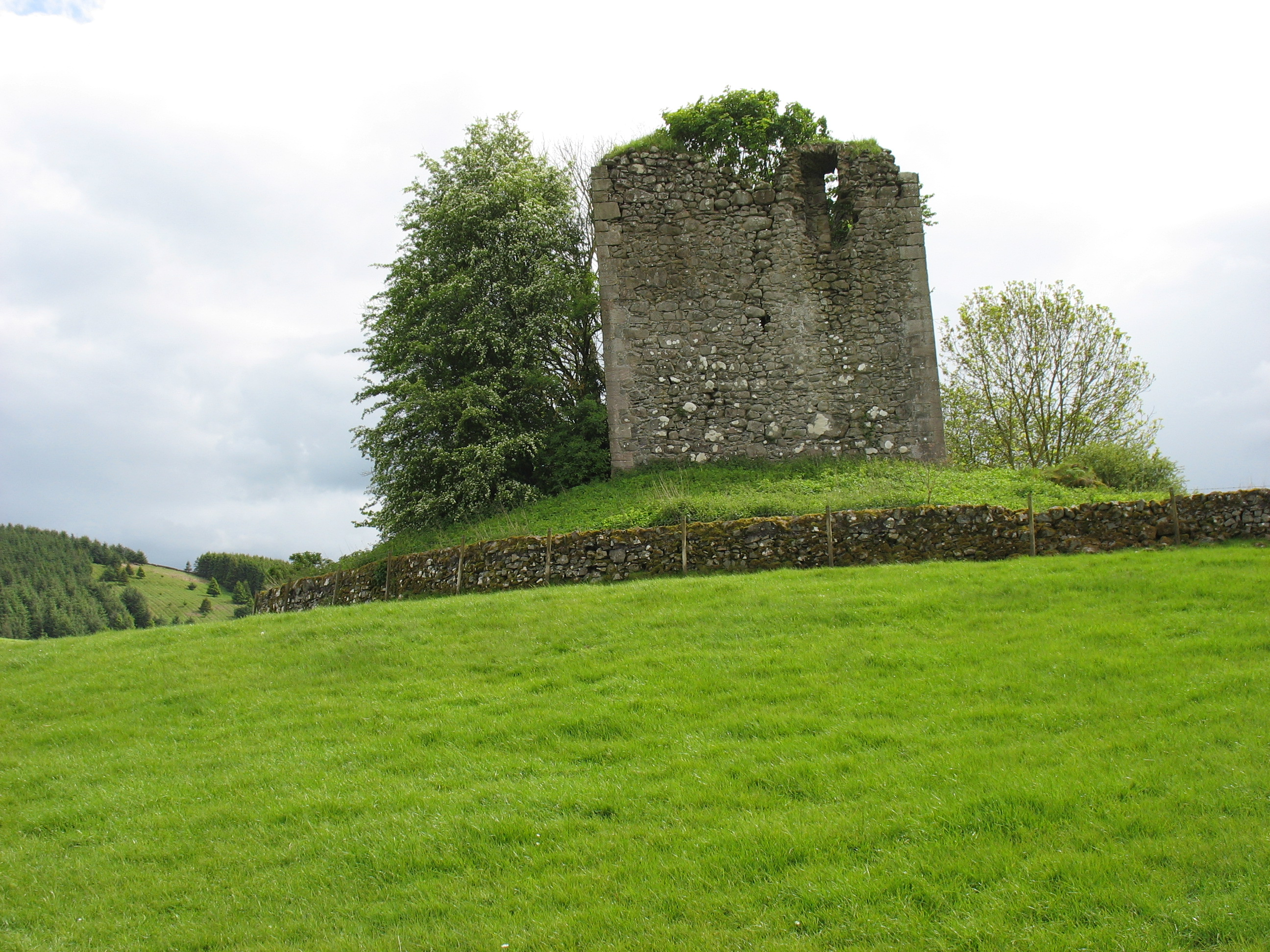
The ruins of Lag Tower, historic seat of the chiefs of Clan Grierson.

Grierson was the eldest son of Sir Robert Grierson, 1st Baronet and his wife Lady Henrietta Douglas.

Grierson was a Scottish Commissioner of Supply in 1704. He stood unsuccessfully for Dumfriesshire as Queensberry's nominee at the 1708 British general election, but was returned as Member of Parliament for Dumfriesshire at a by-election on 7 April 1709. At the 1710 British general election he was asked to stand down in favour of Hon. James Murray, but refused, and managed to regain the seat against Murray. However, he lost it on petition on 22 February 1711.

Grierson accompanied Lord Kenmure in the Jacobite rising of 1715 on the expedition which ended in defeat at Preston. He was captured and imprisoned in Newgate prison and indicted for treason in May 1716. He was released from prison on 18 July 1717, but was then apprehended by the officers of St Andrew's, Holborn to give security, for 'getting a wench with child, while in prison’. By contract dated 1 September 1720, he married Anne Musgrave, daughter of Sir Richard Musgrave, 2nd Baronet and Dorothy James, at Aspartria, Cumberland, England. He was pardoned for his involvement in the rebellion in 1725. In 1733 he succeeded to the baronetcy on the death of his father. In 1740, he sued to be allowed to inherit his father's estate, despite his earlier indictment.

Grierson died without issue in 1760 and was buried at Dunscore Parish Kirkyard. He was succeeded by his younger brother's son, Sir Robert Grierson, 3rd Baronet, of Lag, who was born in about 1700 and died childless in 1764.

Parliament of Great Britain
Preceded by James Johnstone	Member of Parliament for Dumfriesshire; 1709–1711	Succeeded by James Murray
Baronetage of Nova Scotia
Preceded by Robert Grierson	Baronet (of Lag); 1733–1760	Succeeded by Robert Grierson
