= Clan Kirkpatrick =

Lowland Scottish clan

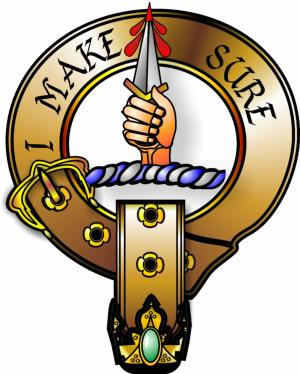
- Motto: I Mak Sikkar (I Make Sure)

Profile
- Region: Lowlands
- District: Dumfriesshire
- Clan Kirkpatrick no longer has a chief, and is an armigerous clan
- Historic seat: Closeburn Castle
Clan branches
Kirkpatrick of Closeburn (historic chiefs)
Kirkpatrick of Conheath
Allied clans
Clan Bruce
Clan Campbell
Clan Douglas
Clan Grierson
Rival clans
Clan Comyn
Clan Lindsay
Clan Charteris
Clan Carruthers
Clan Irvine

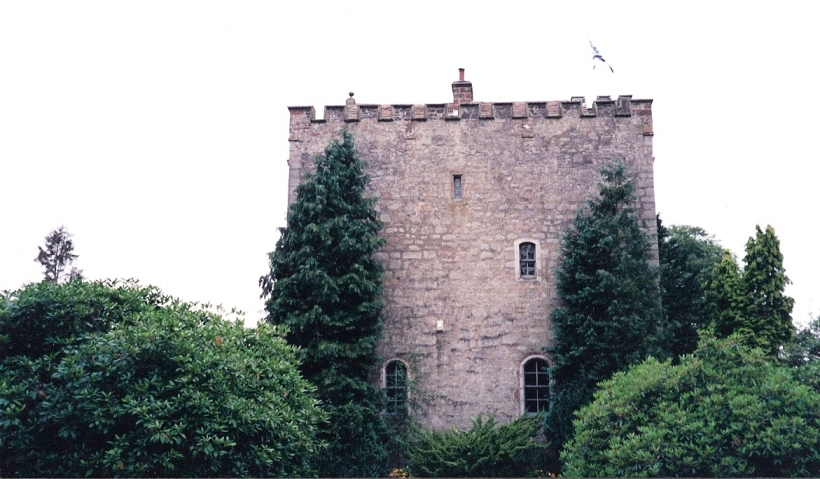
Closeburn Castle, which dates from the late 14th century, was once a stronghold of Clan Kirkpatrick.

Kirkpatrick crests carved into walls of the old Kirkpatrick church in Closeburn. The crest and motto are barely legible above a memorial to William Kirkpatrick.

Clan Kirkpatrick is a Lowland armigerous Scottish clan. There are several variations of the Kirkpatrick name: Kilpatric, Kilpatrick, and Gilpatrick. The names Kirkpatrick and Kilpatrick may have been interchangeable at one time. The clan is recognised by the Court of the Lord Lyon, however the clan does not currently have a chief so recognised. The surname Kirkpatrick is also a recognized sept of Clan Douglas and Clan Colquhoun.

== History ==
=== Origins of the clan ===
==== Traditional origins ====
The clan takes its name from the church of Saint Patrick in the parish of Closeburn in Dumfriesshire, Scotland. Traditionally the Kirkpatrick family of Closeburn have held these lands since the ninth century.

==== Recorded origins ====
The family first appear on record in the twelfth century when Ivone de Kirkpatrick witnessed a charter of the Clan Bruce. Ivone also received a charter of confirmation for all of his lands that was granted to him by Alexander II of Scotland.

=== Wars of Scottish Independence ===
Roger Kirkpatrick was an attendant of Robert the Bruce when he killed John "the Red" Comyn, chief of Clan Comyn in the church at Dumfries. It is said that Kirkpatrick met the Bruce rushing out of the church exclaiming that he thought he had killed Comyn and that Kirkpatrick then drew his dagger with the words, I mak sikkar; meaning “I make sure”; the clan motto and chief's coat of arms allude to this story. Kirkpatrick was sent on an embassy in 1314 with Sir Neil Campbell of Clan Campbell into England and in recompense the Kirkpatrick family received the lands of Redburgh. Sir Roger Kirkpatrick distinguished himself in 1355 when he took both Caerlaverock Castle and Dalswinton Castle from the English. In 1357 Kirkpatrick was murdered by his kinsman, Sir James Lindsay of Clan Lindsay in a private quarrel. The title then passed through a nephew to Sir Thomas Kirkpatrick, who in 1409 received from Robert Stewart, Duke of Albany the baronies of Closeburn and Redburgh.

=== 16th and 17th centuries ===
In 1526 a feud arose with the Clan Charteris. It is recorded in Pitcairn's Criminal Trials of Scotland that John Charteris of Amisfield, along with his brother and two sons, were charged with the murder of Roger Kilpatrick, son of Alexander Kilpatrick in March 1526.

In 1542 Sir Thomas Kirkpatrick's grandson, another Sir Thomas Kirkpatrick, was taken prisoner at the Battle of Solway Moss. The estate then passed through a cousin and in 1685 Sir Thomas Kirkpatrick of Closeburn was created a Baronet of Nova Scotia for his support of Charles I of England. The mansion house that was built by the 1st Baronet burned down in a fire. The 4th Baronet, Sir James sold the Closeburn estates.

In 1563 John Carruthers of Howmains, of Clan Carruthers was indicted, along with Edward Irvine of Bonshaw (chief of Clan Irvine), for an assault on Kirkpatrick of Closeburn, as well as for slaying several other persons.

William Kirkpatrick who was descended from the Kirkpatrick of Conheath branch of the clan was a merchant in Málaga in Spain and he married the eldest daughter of a Belgian baron. His great-granddaughter was Eugénie de Montijo who became Empress of France when she married Napoleon III.

== Chiefship and the senior line ==
Although Clan Kirkpatrick is officially classified by the Court of the Lord Lyon as an armigerous clan (currently lacking a legally recognized chief), Sir Ivone Elliott Kirkpatrick, 11th Baronet (born 1942), is widely considered the presumed Chief of the Name and Arms of Kirkpatrick. This presumption is based on established principles of Scottish heraldic law and genealogical seniority:

- Senior Lineage (The Closeburn Baronetcy): Sir Ivone is the direct male heir and current holder of the historic Kirkpatrick Baronetcy of Closeburn (created in the Baronetage of Nova Scotia in 1685). The Closeburn branch has historically been recognized as the principal house and primary line of the clan, tracing their possession of the lands of Closeburn back to a 1232 charter confirmed by King Alexander II of Scotland.
- Undifferenced Arms: In Scottish heraldry, only the head of a family has the right to bear the primary, unmodified ("undifferenced") coat of arms. All cadet branches must use a differenced version of the arms. Sir Ivone inherits the undifferenced arms of Kirkpatrick of Closeburn, rendering him the senior armigerous representative of the surname.

=== Status as "Presumed" Chief ===
Under Scots law, an individual does not automatically become an official clan chief upon inheriting a title or bloodline. To be formally recognized as Chief of the Name and Arms, a candidate must successfully petition the Court of the Lord Lyon.

The senior line of the family did not pursue formal recognition following the sale of the ancestral Closeburn estate by Sir James Kirkpatrick, 4th Baronet, in 1783. Due to the absence of a modern legal decree from the Lord Lyon, the chiefship remains legally vacant, leaving Sir Ivone as the de facto and presumed chief.

== Castles ==
- Closeburn Castle was main seat of the Kirkpatricks of Closeburn, chiefs of Clan Kirkpatrick.
- Rockhall Tower was a castle that belonged to the Kirkpatricks.
- Torthorwald Castle was another castle that belonged to the Kirkpatricks.
- Tynron Doon is the site of a castle once held by the Kirkpatricks and Robert the Bruce is believed to have stayed there after murdering John Comyn.

== See also ==
- Armigerous clan
- Kirkpatrick baronets
- Colquhoun baronets
