= Cumberland (Nova Scotia provincial electoral district) =

Former provincial electoral district in Nova Scotia, Canada

Nova Scotia electoral district

Defunct provincial electoral district
- Legislature: Nova Scotia House of Assembly
- District created: 1867
- District abolished: 1949
- Last contested: 1945

Cumberland was a provincial electoral district in Nova Scotia, Canada, that, at the time of its dissolution, elected two members to the Nova Scotia House of Assembly. The district existed from 1867 until 1949, when the County of Cumberland was divided into three electoral districts: Cumberland East, Cumberland West, and Cumberland Centre.

== Members of the Legislative Assembly ==
Except for a brief period from 1916 to 1933 when it elected three members, Cumberland almost always elected two members to the Nova Scotia Legislature.

Cumberland elected the following members to the Legislative Assembly:

Legislature	Years	Member	Party	Member	Party
43rd	1945–1949	Martin J. Kaufman	Liberal	Kenneth Judson Cochrane	Liberal
42nd	1941–1945	Archie B. Smith	Progressive Conservative	Kenneth Judson Cochrane	Liberal
41st	1940–1941	Archie B. Smith	Progressive Conservative	Leonard William Fraser	Progressive Conservative
41st	1937–1940	Archie B. Smith	Progressive Conservative	Percy Chapman Black	Progressive Conservative
40th	1933–1937	John S. Smiley	Liberal	Percy Chapman Black	Progressive Conservative

Legislature	Years	Member	Party	Member	Party	Member	Party
39th	1928–1933	Archibald Terris	Labour	Percy Chapman Black	Liberal-Conservative	Daniel George McKenzie	Liberal-Conservative
38th	1925–1928	Archibald Terris	Labour	Percy Chapman Black	Liberal-Conservative	Daniel George McKenzie	Liberal-Conservative
37th	1920–1925	Archibald Terris	Labour	Gilbert Nelson Allen	United Farmer's Party	Daniel George McKenzie	United Farmer's Party
36th	1916–1920	James Ralston	Liberal	James W. Kirkpatrick	Liberal-Conservative	Rufus Carter	Liberal

Legislature	Years	Member	Party	Member	Party
35th	1911–1916	James Ralston	Liberal	Rufus Carter	Liberal
34th	1909–1911	Joshua H. Livingstone	Liberal	Elisha B. Paul	Liberal
34th	1906–1909	William Thomas Pipes	Liberal	Elisha B. Paul	Liberal
33rd	1904–1906	Daniel J. McLeod	Liberal-Conservative	Elisha B. Paul	Liberal
33rd	1901–1904	Daniel J. McLeod	Liberal-Conservative	Thomas Reuben Black	Liberal
32nd	1897–1901	Alexander E. Fraser	Liberal	Thomas Reuben Black	Liberal
31st	1894–1897	Alexander E. Fraser	Liberal	Thomas Reuben Black	Liberal
30th	1890–1894	William Oxley	Liberal-Conservative	George W. Forrest	Liberal-Conservative
29th	1886–1890	Richard L. Black	Liberal-Conservative	Thomas Reuben Black	Liberal
28th	1884–1886	William Thomas Pipes	Liberal	Thomas Reuben Black	Liberal
28th	1882–1884	William Thomas Pipes	Liberal	Charles James Townshend	Liberal-Conservative
27th	1878–1882	Edward Vickery	Liberal-Conservative	Charles James Townshend	Liberal-Conservative
26th	1875–1878	Edward Vickery	Liberal-Conservative	seat abolished*		Hiram Black	Independent
26th	1874–1875	Edward Vickery	Liberal-Conservative	Amos Purdy	Liberal	Hiram Black	Independent
25th	1871–1874	Edward Vickery	Liberal-Conservative	Henry Gesner Pineo Jr.	Liberal-Conservative
24th	1867–1871	Amos Purdy	Anti-Confederation Party	Henry Gesner Pineo Jr.	Liberal-Conservative

^{* NB} During the election of 1874, claims of collusion and ballot stuffing were made, which resulted in 3 members being elected on behalf of Cumberland County. After investigation, however, along with public pressure, Amos Purdy resigned his seat, returning the district to their normal 2-member representation in the House.

== Election results ==
=== 1933–1945: two members ===
1945 Nova Scotia general election
Party	Candidate	Votes	%	Elected
Liberal	Kenneth Judson Cochrane	6,995	23.17%	✓
Liberal	Martin J. Kaufman	6,540	21.67%	✓
Progressive Conservative	Archie B. Smith	6,271	20.77%	
Progressive Conservative	Norman Shaw Sanford	5,807	19.24%	
Co-operative Commonwealth	John James Crummey	2,867	9.50%	
Co-operative Commonwealth	Joseph Bernard Murray	1,706	5.65%	
Total		30,186	–	
Source(s) Source: Nova Scotia Legislature (2024). "Electoral History for Cumberland" (PDF). nslegislature.ca. Nova Scotia Legislature (1945). Returns of the General Election for the House of Assembly (PDF) (Report). Queen's Printer. Archived from the original (PDF) on September 10, 2018.

1941 Nova Scotia general election
Party	Candidate	Votes	%	Elected
Liberal	Kenneth Judson Cochrane	7,970	25.90%	✓
Progressive Conservative	Archie B. Smith	7,954	25.84%	✓
Progressive Conservative	Leonard William Fraser	7,814	25.39%	
Liberal	Archibald J. Mason	7,040	22.87%	
Total		30,778	–	
Source(s) Source: Nova Scotia Legislature (2024). "Electoral History for Cumberland" (PDF). nslegislature.ca. Nova Scotia Legislature (1941). Returns of the General Election for the House of Assembly (PDF) (Report). Queen's Printer. Archived from the original (PDF) on February 8, 2024.

Nova Scotia provincial by-election, 1940-10-28
Party	Candidate	Votes	%	Elected
Progressive Conservative	Leonard William Fraser	acclaimed	N/A	✓
Total			–	
Source(s) Source: Nova Scotia Legislature (2024). "Electoral History for Cumberland" (PDF). nslegislature.ca.

1937 Nova Scotia general election
Party	Candidate	Votes	%	Elected
Progressive Conservative	Percy Chapman Black	10,289	28.88%	✓
Progressive Conservative	Archie B. Smith	9,272	26.02%	✓
Liberal	John S. Smiley	8,047	22.58%	
Liberal	Archibald J. Mason	8,024	22.52%	
Total		35,632	–	
Source(s) Source: Nova Scotia Legislature (2024). "Electoral History for Cumberland" (PDF). nslegislature.ca. Nova Scotia Legislature (1937). Returns of the General Election for the House of Assembly (PDF) (Report). Queen's Printer. Archived from the original (PDF) on March 1, 2019.

1933 Nova Scotia general election
Party	Candidate	Votes	%	Elected
Liberal	John S. Smiley	9,540	26.15%	✓
Liberal–Conservative	Percy Chapman Black	9,406	25.78%	✓
Liberal	Earle B. Paul	9,242	25.34%	
Liberal–Conservative	Archibald Terris	8,291	22.73%	
Total		36,479	–	
Source(s) Source: Nova Scotia Legislature (2024). "Electoral History for Cumberland" (PDF). nslegislature.ca. Nova Scotia Legislature (1933). Returns of the General Election for the House of Assembly (PDF) (Report). Queen's Printer. Archived from the original (PDF) on March 1, 2019.

=== 1916–1933: three members ===
1928 Nova Scotia general election
Party	Candidate	Votes	%	Elected
Liberal–Conservative	Percy Chapman Black	7,710	19.78%	✓
Labour	Archibald Terris	6,667	17.11%	✓
Liberal–Conservative	Daniel George McKenzie	6,605	16.95%	✓
Liberal	John S. Smiley	6,230	15.99%	
Liberal	Kenneth Judson Cochrane	5,999	15.39%	
Liberal	Charles H. Read	5,758	14.78%	
Total		38,969	–	
Source(s) Source: Nova Scotia Legislature (2024). "Electoral History for Cumberland" (PDF). nslegislature.ca.

Nova Scotia provincial by-election, 1925-08-01
Party	Candidate	Votes	%	Elected
Liberal–Conservative	Percy Chapman Black	acclaimed	N/A	✓
Total			–	
Source(s) Source: Nova Scotia Legislature (2024). "Electoral History for Cumberland" (PDF). nslegislature.ca.

1925 Nova Scotia general election
Party	Candidate	Votes	%	Elected
Liberal–Conservative	Percy Chapman Black	9,057	22.11%	✓
Liberal–Conservative	Daniel George McKenzie	8,580	20.95%	✓
Labour	Archibald Terris	8,267	20.18%	✓
Liberal	James Ralston	5,508	13.45%	
Liberal	Charles H. Read	4,797	11.71%	
Liberal	James M. Wardrope	4,754	11.61%	
Total		40,963	–	
Source(s) Source: Nova Scotia Legislature (2024). "Electoral History for Cumberland" (PDF). nslegislature.ca.

1920 Nova Scotia general election
Party	Candidate	Votes	%	Elected
United Farmers	Gilbert Nelson Allen	4,934	16.01%	✓
United Farmers	Daniel George McKenzie	4,766	15.46%	✓
Labour	Archibald Terris	4,716	15.30%	✓
Liberal	James Ralston	4,486	14.55%	
Liberal	Rufus Carter	3,215	10.43%	
Liberal	Varley B. Fullerton	2,659	8.63%	
Liberal–Conservative	Grace McLeod Rogers	2,470	8.01%	
Liberal–Conservative	Percy L. Spicer	1,864	6.05%	
Liberal–Conservative	Everett C. Leslie	1,714	5.56%	
Total		29,110	–	
Source(s) Source: Nova Scotia Legislature (2024). "Electoral History for Cumberland" (PDF). nslegislature.ca.

1916 Nova Scotia general election
Party	Candidate	Votes	%	Elected
Liberal	Rufus Carter	3,962	17.09%	✓
Liberal	James Ralston	3,951	17.05%	✓
Liberal–Conservative	James W. Kirkpatrick	3,791	16.36%	✓
Liberal–Conservative	Daniel A. Morrison	3,620	15.62%	
Liberal–Conservative	J. Flemming Gilroy	3,572	15.41%	
Liberal	Joshua H. Livingstone	3,554	15.33%	
Labour	James B. Nelson	727	3.14%	
Total		23,177	–	
Source(s) Source: Nova Scotia Legislature (2024). "Electoral History for Cumberland" (PDF). nslegislature.ca.

=== 1867–1911: two members ===
1911 Nova Scotia general election
Party	Candidate	Votes	%	Elected
Liberal	James Ralston	4,168	26.10%	✓
Liberal	Rufus Carter	4,154	26.01%	✓
Liberal–Conservative	J. Flemming Gilroy	4,030	25.24%	
Liberal–Conservative	C. R. Smith	3,617	22.65%	
Total		15,969	–	
Source(s) Source: Nova Scotia Legislature (2024). "Electoral History for Cumberland" (PDF). nslegislature.ca.

Nova Scotia provincial by-election, 1909-11-24
Party	Candidate	Votes	%	Elected
Liberal	Joshua H. Livingstone	3,200	43.27%	✓
Liberal–Conservative	T. S. Rogers	2,918	39.45%	
Labour	A. F. Landry	1,278	17.28%	
Total		7,396	–	
Source(s) Source: Nova Scotia Legislature (2024). "Electoral History for Cumberland" (PDF). nslegislature.ca.

1906 Nova Scotia general election
Party	Candidate	Votes	%	Elected
Liberal	Elisha B. Paul	3,619	26.57%	✓
Liberal	William Thomas Pipes	3,587	26.34%	✓
Liberal–Conservative	Daniel J. McLeod	3,419	25.10%	
Liberal–Conservative	C. F. Jamison	2,995	21.99%	
Total		13,620	–	
Source(s) Source: Nova Scotia Legislature (2024). "Electoral History for Cumberland" (PDF). nslegislature.ca.

Nova Scotia provincial by-election, 1904-12-15
Party	Candidate	Votes	%	Elected
Liberal	Elisha B. Paul	3,256	54.73%	✓
Liberal–Conservative	J.W. Day	2,693	45.27%	
Total		5,949	–	
Source(s) Source: Nova Scotia Legislature (2024). "Electoral History for Cumberland" (PDF). nslegislature.ca.

1901 Nova Scotia general election
Party	Candidate	Votes	%	Elected
Liberal–Conservative	Daniel J. McLeod	2,946	25.52%	✓
Liberal	Thomas Reuben Black	2,944	25.50%	✓
Liberal	M. L. Tucker	2,933	25.41%	
Liberal–Conservative	C. R. Smith	2,720	23.56%	
Total		11,543	–	
Source(s) Source: Nova Scotia Legislature (2024). "Electoral History for Cumberland" (PDF). nslegislature.ca.

1897 Nova Scotia general election
Party	Candidate	Votes	%	Elected
Liberal	Thomas Reuben Black	3,487	29.14%	✓
Liberal	Alexander E. Fraser	3,251	27.16%	✓
Liberal–Conservative	A. A. McKinnon	2,689	22.47%	
Liberal–Conservative	J. C. McDougall	2,541	21.23%	
Total		11,968	–	
Source(s) Source: Nova Scotia Legislature (2024). "Electoral History for Cumberland" (PDF). nslegislature.ca.

1894 Nova Scotia general election
Party	Candidate	Votes	%	Elected
Liberal	Thomas Reuben Black	3,109	28.47%	✓
Liberal	Alexander E. Fraser	2,902	26.58%	✓
Liberal–Conservative	George W. Forrest	2,498	22.88%	
Liberal–Conservative	William Oxley	2,411	22.08%	
Total		10,920	–	
Source(s) Source: Nova Scotia Legislature (2024). "Electoral History for Cumberland" (PDF). nslegislature.ca.

1890 Nova Scotia general election
Party	Candidate	Votes	%	Elected
Liberal–Conservative	George W. Forrest	2,818	27.30%	✓
Liberal–Conservative	William Oxley	2,715	26.30%	✓
Liberal	Thomas Reuben Black	2,537	24.58%	
Liberal	Richard L. Black	2,252	21.82%	
Total		10,322	–	
Source(s) Source: Nova Scotia Legislature (2024). "Electoral History for Cumberland" (PDF). nslegislature.ca.

1886 Nova Scotia general election
Party	Candidate	Votes	%	Elected
Liberal	Thomas Reuben Black	2,083	25.15%	✓
Liberal–Conservative	Richard L. Black	2,064	24.92%	✓
Liberal	George W. Forrest	1,939	23.41%	
Liberal–Conservative	C. J. MacFarlane	1,855	22.40%	
Independent	James B. Wilson	341	4.12%	
Total		8,282	–	
Source(s) Source: Nova Scotia Legislature (2024). "Electoral History for Cumberland" (PDF). nslegislature.ca.

Nova Scotia provincial by-election, 1884-07-02
Party	Candidate	Votes	%	Elected
Liberal	Thomas Reuben Black	acclaimed	N/A	✓
Total			–	
Source(s) Source: Nova Scotia Legislature (2024). "Electoral History for Cumberland" (PDF). nslegislature.ca.

1882 Nova Scotia general election
Party	Candidate	Votes	%	Elected
Liberal	William Thomas Pipes	1,875	27.71%	✓
Liberal–Conservative	Charles James Townshend	1,690	24.98%	✓
Liberal	Charles Smith	1,682	24.86%	
Liberal–Conservative	Edward Vickery	1,519	22.45%	
Total		6,766	–	
Source(s) Source: Nova Scotia Legislature (2024). "Electoral History for Cumberland" (PDF). nslegislature.ca.

1878 Nova Scotia general election
Party	Candidate	Votes	%	Elected
Liberal–Conservative	Charles James Townshend	1,792	27.88%	✓
Liberal–Conservative	Edward Vickery	1,667	25.94%	✓
Liberal	William Oxley	1,657	25.78%	
Liberal	C. Lewis	1,311	20.40%	
Total		6,427	–	
Source(s) Source: Nova Scotia Legislature (2024). "Electoral History for Cumberland" (PDF). nslegislature.ca.

1874 Nova Scotia general election
Party	Candidate	Votes	%	Elected
Independent	Hiram Black	1,461	27.70%	✓
Liberal	Amos Purdy	1,304	24.72%	✓
Liberal–Conservative	Edward Vickery	1,301	24.66%	
Liberal–Conservative	Charles James Townshend	1,209	22.92%	
Total		5,275	–	
Source(s) Source: Nova Scotia Legislature (2024). "Electoral History for Cumberland" (PDF). nslegislature.ca.

1871 Nova Scotia general election
Party	Candidate	Votes	%	Elected
Liberal–Conservative	Henry Gesner Pineo Jr.	1,605	31.00%	✓
Liberal–Conservative	Edward Vickery	1,584	30.59%	✓
Liberal	George Hibbard	1,043	20.14%	
Liberal	J. K. Kiderkin	946	18.27%	
Total		5,178	–	
Source(s) Source: Nova Scotia Legislature (2024). "Electoral History for Cumberland" (PDF). nslegislature.ca.

1867 Nova Scotia general election
Party	Candidate	Votes	%	Elected
Confederation	Henry Gesner Pineo Jr.	1,337	25.61%	✓
Anti-Confederation	Amos Purdy	1,309	25.07%	✓
Anti-Confederation	W. Fullerton	1,291	24.73%	
Confederation	Edward Vickery	1,284	24.59%	
Total		5,221	–	
Source(s) Source: Nova Scotia Legislature (2024). "Electoral History for Cumberland" (PDF). nslegislature.ca.

== See also ==
- List of Nova Scotia provincial electoral districts
- Canadian provincial electoral districts
