= Archie B. Smith =

Canadian politician

MLA for Cumberland County
- In office 1937–1945
- Preceded by: John S. Smiley
- Succeeded by: Martin J. Kaufman

Personal details
- Born: July 1, 1896 Rodney, Nova Scotia
- Died: October 2, 1951 (aged 55) Truro, Nova Scotia
- Party: Progressive Conservative
- Occupation: lumber dealer, farmer

Archie Barney Smith (July 1, 1896 – October 2, 1951) was a Canadian politician. He represented the electoral district of Cumberland County in the Nova Scotia House of Assembly from 1937 to 1945. He was a member of the Progressive Conservative Party of Nova Scotia.

== Biography ==
Born in 1896 at Rodney, Cumberland County, Nova Scotia, Smith was a lumber dealer, farmer and contractor by career. He married Agnes Reid in 1919. Smith served as a municipal councillor in Cumberland County for 12 years.

Smith entered provincial politics in 1937, when he was elected in the dual-member Cumberland County riding with Conservative Percy Chapman Black. Following Black's resignation, Smith served with Conservative Leonard William Fraser. In the 1941 election, Smith finished 140 votes ahead of Fraser to win the second seat, with Liberal Kenneth Judson Cochrane winning the first. He was defeated when he ran for re-election in 1945, finishing third behind Cochrane and Liberal Martin J. Kaufman.

On September 26, 1951, Smith was involved in an automobile accident in Kemptown, Nova Scotia. He died as a result of his injuries at Truro on October 2.
