= Cumberland (federal electoral district) =

Former federal electoral district in Nova Scotia, Canada

Nova Scotia electoral district

Defunct federal electoral district
- Legislature: House of Commons
- District created: 1867
- District abolished: 1966
- First contested: 1867
- Last contested: 1965

Demographics
- Census division: Cumberland

Cumberland was a federal electoral district in Nova Scotia, Canada, that was represented in the House of Commons of Canada from 1867 to 1968. It was created in the British North America Act, 1867, and was abolished in 1966 when it was merged into Cumberland—Colchester North riding. The district consisted of the County of Cumberland.

== Members of Parliament ==
This riding has elected the following members of Parliament:

Parliament	Years	Member	Party
Cumberland
1st	1867–1870	Charles Tupper	Conservative
1st	1870–1872	Charles Tupper	Conservative
2nd	1872–1874	Charles Tupper	Conservative
3rd	1874–1878	Charles Tupper	Conservative
4th	1878–1878	Charles Tupper	Conservative
4th	1878–1882	Charles Tupper	Conservative
5th	1882–1884	Charles Tupper	Conservative
5th	1884–1887	Charles James Townshend	Liberal–Conservative
6th	1887–1887	Charles Tupper	Conservative
6th	1887–1888	Charles Tupper	Conservative
6th	1888–1888	Arthur Rupert Dickey	Conservative
6th	1888–1891	Arthur Rupert Dickey	Conservative
7th	1891–1891	Arthur Rupert Dickey	Conservative
7th	1892–1894	Arthur Rupert Dickey	Conservative
7th	1895–1896	Arthur Rupert Dickey	Conservative
8th	1896–1900	Hance James Logan	Liberal
9th	1900–1904	Hance James Logan	Liberal
10th	1904–1908	Hance James Logan	Liberal
11th	1908–1911	Edgar Nelson Rhodes	Conservative
12th	1911–1917	Edgar Nelson Rhodes	Conservative
13th	1917–1921	Edgar Nelson Rhodes	Government (Unionist)
14th	1921–1925	Hance James Logan	Liberal
15th	1925–1926	Robert Knowlton Smith	Conservative
16th	1926–1930	Robert Knowlton Smith	Conservative
17th	1930–1935	Robert Knowlton Smith	Conservative
18th	1935–1940	Kenneth Judson Cochrane	Liberal
19th	1940–1945	Percy Chapman Black	National Government
20th	1945–1949	Percy Chapman Black	Progressive Conservative
21st	1949–1953	Percy Chapman Black	Progressive Conservative
22nd	1953–1957	Azel Randolph Lusby	Liberal
23rd	1957–1958	Robert Coates	Progressive Conservative
24th	1958–1962	Robert Coates	Progressive Conservative
25th	1962–1963	Robert Coates	Progressive Conservative
26th	1963–1965	Robert Coates	Progressive Conservative
27th	1965–1968	Robert Coates	Progressive Conservative
Riding dissolved into Cumberland—Colchester North

== Election results ==
=== 1965 ===
1965 Canadian federal election
Party	Candidate	Votes	%	±%
Progressive Conservative	Robert Coates	9,560	53.18	+2.97
Liberal	C. Elmer Bragg	7,088	39.43	–5.49
New Democratic	Carson Carlyle Spicer	1,327	7.38	+2.52
Total valid votes		17,975	99.31	
Total rejected ballots		125	0.69	+0.20
Turnout		18,100	86.94	+3.14
Eligible voters/turnout		20,818		
Progressive Conservative hold		Swing		–1.26
Source: Library of Parliament

=== 1963 ===
1963 Canadian federal election
Party	Candidate	Votes	%	±%
Progressive Conservative	Robert Coates	9,034	50.22	–0.52
Liberal	H. Keith Russell	8,082	44.92	+3.28
New Democratic	Carson Carlyle Spicer	874	4.86	–1.88
Total valid votes		17,990	99.51	
Total rejected ballots		89	0.49	–0.42
Turnout		18,079	83.80	–3.39
Eligible voters/turnout		21,573		
Progressive Conservative hold		Swing		+1.38
Source: Library of Parliament

=== 1962 ===
1962 Canadian federal election
Party	Candidate	Votes	%	±%
Progressive Conservative	Robert Coates	9,524	50.74	–9.46
Liberal	H. Keith Russell	7,817	41.64	+1.84
New Democratic	Carson Carlyle Spicer	1,265	6.74	–
Social Credit	John Vincent Forbes	165	0.88	–
Total valid votes		18,771	99.09	
Total rejected ballots		173	0.91	+0.32
Turnout		18,944	87.19	+3.37
Eligible voters/turnout		21,727		
Progressive Conservative hold		Swing		–3.81
Source: Library of Parliament

=== 1958 ===
1958 Canadian federal election
Party	Candidate	Votes	%	±%
Progressive Conservative	Robert Coates	11,379	60.19	+5.68
Liberal	Azel Randolph Lusby	7,525	39.81	–5.68
Total valid votes		18,904	99.41	
Total rejected ballots		113	0.59	–0.02
Turnout		19,017	83.82	+2.40
Eligible voters/turnout		22,688		
Progressive Conservative hold		Swing		+5.68
Source: Library of Parliament

=== 1957 ===
1957 Canadian federal election
Party	Candidate	Votes	%	±%
Progressive Conservative	Robert Coates	10,065	54.51	+6.26
Liberal	Azel Randolph Lusby	8,398	45.49	–6.26
Total valid votes		18,463	99.39	
Total rejected ballots		114	0.61	+0.03
Turnout		18,577	81.42	+9.18
Eligible voters/turnout		22,815		
Progressive Conservative gain from Liberal		Swing		+6.26
Source: Library of Parliament

=== 1953 ===
1953 Canadian federal election
Party	Candidate	Votes	%	±%
Liberal	Azel Randolph Lusby	8,860	51.74	+7.65
Progressive Conservative	William Harmon Wasson	8,263	48.26	–1.56
Total valid votes		17,123	99.42	
Total rejected ballots		100	0.58	+0.13
Turnout		17,223	72.25	–9.57
Eligible voters/turnout		23,839		
Liberal gain from Progressive Conservative		Swing		+7.65
Source: Library of Parliament

=== 1949 ===
1949 Canadian federal election
Party	Candidate	Votes	%	±%
Progressive Conservative	Percy Chapman Black	9,850	49.82	+2.92
Liberal	Lawrence Martin Hanway	8,718	44.09	+10.56
Co-operative Commonwealth	Douglas Haig MacBrien	1,205	6.09	–13.48
Total valid votes		19,773	99.55	
Total rejected ballots		89	0.45	–0.39
Turnout		19,862	81.82	+3.64
Eligible voters/turnout		24,275		
Progressive Conservative hold		Swing		+6.74
Source: Library of Parliament

=== 1945 ===
1945 Canadian federal election
Party	Candidate	Votes	%	±%
Progressive Conservative	Percy Chapman Black	9,121	46.89	+0.86
Liberal	Archibald J. Mason	6,522	33.53	–12.43
Co-operative Commonwealth	John James Crummey	3,807	19.57	+11.57
Total valid votes		19,450	99.16	
Total rejected ballots		165	0.84	–0.06
Turnout		19,615	78.18	+3.84
Eligible voters/turnout		25,090		
Progressive Conservative gain from National Government		Swing		+17.23
Source: Library of Parliament

=== 1940 ===
1940 Canadian federal election
Party	Candidate	Votes	%	±%
National Government	Percy Chapman Black	8,073	46.03	+2.33
Liberal	Kenneth Judson Cochrane	8,061	45.97	+2.26
Co-operative Commonwealth	Guy Alton Demings	1,403	8.00	–
Total valid votes		17,537	99.10	
Total rejected ballots		160	0.90	–0.08
Turnout		17,697	74.34	–3.32
Eligible voters/turnout		23,807		
National Government gain from Liberal		Swing		+24.15
Source: Library of Parliament

=== 1935 ===
1935 Canadian federal election
Party	Candidate	Votes	%	±%
Liberal	Kenneth Judson Cochrane	7,473	43.70	–1.83
Conservative	Dara Mason Cochrane	7,158	41.86	–12.61
Reconstruction	Alexander Leadbetter	2,469	14.44	–
Total valid votes		17,100	99.02	
Total rejected ballots		170	0.98	+0.54
Turnout		17,270	77.66	–5.07
Eligible voters/turnout		22,239		
Liberal gain from Conservative		Swing		–7.22
Source: Library of Parliament

=== 1930 ===
1930 Canadian federal election
Party	Candidate	Votes	%	±%
Conservative	Robert Knowlton Smith	8,854	54.47	–0.83
Liberal	John S. Smiley	7,401	45.53	+0.83
Total valid votes		16,255	99.55	
Total rejected ballots		73	0.45	+0.45
Turnout		16,328	82.72	+13.20
Eligible voters/turnout		19,738		
Conservative hold		Swing		–0.83
Source: Library of Parliament

=== 1926 ===
1926 Canadian federal election
Party	Candidate	Votes	%	±%
Conservative	Robert Knowlton Smith	8,176	55.30	-2.15
Liberal	James Albert Hanway	6,609	44.70	+2.15
Total valid votes		14,785	–	
Source: Library of Parliament

=== 1925 ===
1925 Canadian federal election
Party	Candidate	Votes	%	±%
Conservative	Robert Knowlton Smith	8,492	57.44	+31.92
Liberal	Hance James Logan	6,291	42.56	-13.99
Total valid votes		14,783	–	
Source: Library of Parliament

=== 1921 ===
1921 Canadian federal election
Party	Candidate	Votes	%	±%
Liberal	Hance James Logan	9,762	56.55	+11.49
Conservative	Charles Edward Bent	4,407	25.53	–
Progressive	James Anderson Mackinnon	3,094	17.92	–
Total valid votes		17,263	–	
Source: Library of Parliament

=== 1917 ===
1917 Canadian federal election
Party	Candidate	Votes	%	±%
Government (Unionist)	Edgar Nelson Rhodes	6,655	54.94	–
Opposition	Hance James Logan	5,459	45.06	–
Total valid votes		12,114	–	
Source: Library of Parliament

=== 1911 ===
1911 Canadian federal election
Party	Candidate	Votes	%	±%
Conservative	Edgar Nelson Rhodes	4,780	51.83	-0.86
Liberal	Hance James Logan	4,442	48.17	+0.86
Total valid votes		9,222	–	
Source: Library of Parliament

=== 1908 ===
1908 Canadian federal election
Party	Candidate	Votes	%	±%
Conservative	Edgar Nelson Rhodes	4,800	52.69	+6.91
Liberal	James Ralston	4,310	47.31	-6.91
Total valid votes		9,110	–	
Source: Library of Parliament

=== 1904 ===
1904 Canadian federal election
Party	Candidate	Votes	%	±%
Liberal	Hance James Logan	4,535	54.22	+1.42
Conservative	T. Sherman Rogers	3,829	45.78	-1.42
Total valid votes		8,364	–	
Source: Library of Parliament

=== 1900 ===
1900 Canadian federal election
Party	Candidate	Votes	%	±%
Liberal	Hance James Logan	3,742	52.80	+1.66
Conservative	Charles Cahan	3,345	47.20	-1.66
Total valid votes		7,087	–	
Source: Library of Parliament

=== 1896 ===
1896 Canadian federal election
Party	Candidate	Votes	%	±%
Liberal	Hance James Logan	3,462	51.14	+11.86
Conservative	Arthur Rupert Dickey	3,307	48.86	-6.18
Total valid votes		6,769	–	
Source: Library of Parliament

=== 1895 by-election ===
Canadian federal by-election, 15 January 1895 On Arthur Rupert Dickey being named Secretary of State for Canada, 21 December 1894
Party	Candidate	Votes
Conservative	Arthur Rupert Dickey	acclaimed
Total valid votes		–

=== 1892 by-election ===
Canadian federal by-election, 30 January 1892 On Arthur Rupert Dickey being unseated, 22 December 1891
Party	Candidate	Votes
Conservative	Arthur Rupert Dickey	acclaimed
Total valid votes		–

=== 1891 ===
1891 Canadian federal election
Party	Candidate	Votes	%	±%
Conservative	Arthur Rupert Dickey	2,935	55.03	+0.52
Liberal	D.S. Howard	2,095	39.28	-2.17
Progressive	C.R. Casey	303	5.68	–
Total valid votes		5,333	–	
Source: Library of Parliament

=== 1888 by-election ===
Canadian federal by-election, 26 December 1888 On election being declared void
Party	Candidate	Votes	%
Conservative	Arthur Rupert Dickey	2,479	63.40
Unknown	Elderkin	1,430	36.60
Total valid votes		3,910	–

=== 1888 by-election ===
Canadian federal by-election, 13 July 1888 On Charles Tupper being named High Commissioner for Canada in the United Kingdom, 23 May 1888
Party	Candidate	Votes	%
Conservative	Arthur Rupert Dickey	2,491	59.06
Unknown	C.R. Casey	1,727	40.94
Total valid votes		4,218	–

=== 1887 by-election ===
Canadian federal by-election, 9 November 1887 On election being declared void
Party	Candidate	Votes	%
Conservative	Charles Tupper	2,468	70.64
Independent	J.T. Balmer	1,026	29.36
Total valid votes		3,494	–

=== 1887 ===
1887 Canadian federal election
Party	Candidate	Votes	%	±%
Conservative	Charles Tupper	2,788	54.52	–
Liberal	William Thomas Pipes	2,120	41.45	–
Unknown	J.T. Bulmer	206	4.03	–
Total valid votes		5,114	–	
Source: Library of Parliament

=== 1884 by-election ===
Canadian federal by-election, 26 June 1884 On Charles Tupper being appointed High Commissioner for Canada in the United Kingdom, 24 May 1884
Party	Candidate	Votes
Liberal–Conservative	Charles James Townshend	acclaimed
Total valid votes		–

=== 1882 ===
1882 Canadian federal election
Party	Candidate	Votes
Conservative	Charles Tupper	acclaimed
Source: Library of Parliament

=== 1878 by-election ===
Canadian federal by-election, 4 November 1878 On Charles Tupper being named Minister of Public Works, 17 October 1878
Party	Candidate	Votes
Conservative	Charles Tupper	acclaimed
Total valid votes		–

=== 1878 ===
1878 Canadian federal election
Party	Candidate	Votes	%	±%
Conservative	Charles Tupper	2,030	58.03	+1.22
Unknown	William Thomas Pipes	1,468	41.97	-1.22
Total valid votes		3,498	–	
Source: Library of Parliament

=== 1874 ===
1874 Canadian federal election
Party	Candidate	Votes	%	±%
Conservative	Charles Tupper	1,580	56.81	-17.81
Unknown	George Hibbard	1,201	43.19	+17.81
Total valid votes		2,781	–	
Source: Library of Parliament

=== 1872 ===
1872 Canadian federal election
Party	Candidate	Votes	%	±%
Conservative	Charles Tupper	1,911	74.62	+22.78
Unknown	William A.D. Morse	650	25.38	–
Total valid votes		2,561	–	
Source: Library of Parliament

=== 1870 by-election ===
Canadian federal by-election, 15 June 1870 On Charles Tupper being called to the Privy Council and appointed President of that body, June 1870
Party	Candidate	Votes
Conservative	Charles Tupper	acclaimed
Total valid votes		–

=== 1867 ===
1867 Canadian federal election
Party	Candidate	Votes	%
Conservative	Charles Tupper	1,368	51.84
Anti-Confederation	William Annand	1,271	48.16
Total valid votes		2,639	–
Source: Library of Parliament

== See also ==
- List of Canadian electoral districts
- Historical federal electoral districts of Canada
