= Hance James Logan =

Canadian politician

The Hon. Hance James Logan
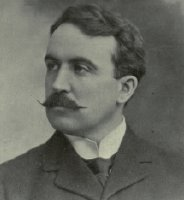

Senator for Cumberland, Nova Scotia
- In office February 5, 1929 – December 26, 1944
- Appointed by: William Lyon Mackenzie King

Member of the Canadian Parliament for Cumberland
- In office 1896–1911
- Preceded by: Arthur Rupert Dickey
- Succeeded by: Edgar Nelson Rhodes
- In office 1921–1925
- Preceded by: Edgar Nelson Rhodes
- Succeeded by: Robert Knowlton Smith

Personal details
- Born: April 26, 1869 Amherst Point, Nova Scotia
- Died: December 26, 1944 (aged 75) Ottawa, Ontario
- Party: Liberal

Hance James Logan, KC (April 26, 1869 – December 26, 1944) was a Canadian lawyer and politician.

== Biography ==
Born in Amherst Point, Nova Scotia, the son of James Archibald Logan, he was educated at the Model School of Truro, the Pictou Academy and Dalhousie University where he graduated with a Bachelor of Laws (LL.B.) in 1891. He was called to the Nova Scotia bar in 1892 and practised law in Amherst. In 1909, he was named King's Counsel.

Logan was first elected to the House of Commons of Canada for the electoral district of Cumberland on June 23, 1896, by a majority of 155 votes, defeating Arthur Rupert Dickey, the Minister of Justice in the Charles Tupper Government. A Liberal, he was re-elected in 1900 and 1904. He was defeated in 1911 and 1917. He was re-elected in 1921 and was defeated in 1925. In 1929, he was summoned to the Senate of Canada representing the senatorial division of Cumberland, Nova Scotia on the advice of William Lyon Mackenzie King. He served until his death in 1944.

He was married twice: to Eleanor L. Kinder in 1891 and then to Anna Blanche MacKenna in 1921.

== Electoral record ==
1896 Canadian federal election: Cumberland
Party	Candidate	Votes	%	±%
Liberal	Hance James Logan	3,462	51.14	+11.86
Conservative	Arthur Rupert Dickey	3,307	48.86	–6.18
Total valid votes		6,769	100.00	
Total rejected ballots		unknown		
Turnout		6,769	70.33	+4.46
Eligible voters/turnout		9,624		
Liberal gain from Conservative		Swing		+11.86
Source: Library of Parliament

1900 Canadian federal election: Cumberland
Party	Candidate	Votes	%	±%
Liberal	Hance James Logan	3,742	52.80	+1.66
Conservative	Charles Cahan	3,345	47.20	–1.66
Total valid votes		7,087	100.00	
Total rejected ballots		unknown		
Turnout		7,087	79.71	+9.38
Eligible voters/turnout		8,891		
Liberal hold		Swing		+1.66
Source: Library of Parliament

1904 Canadian federal election: Cumberland
Party	Candidate	Votes	%	±%
Liberal	Hance James Logan	4,535	54.22	+1.42
Conservative	T. Sherman Rogers	3,829	45.78	–1.42
Total valid votes		8,364	100.00	
Total rejected ballots		unknown		
Turnout		8,364	78.68	–1.03
Eligible voters/turnout		10,631		
Liberal hold		Swing		+1.42
Source: Library of Parliament

1917 Canadian federal election: Cumberland
Party	Candidate	Votes	%	±%
Government (Unionist)	Edgar Nelson Rhodes	6,655	54.94	+3.11
Opposition	Hance James Logan	5,459	45.06	–3.11
Total valid votes		12,114	100.00	
Total rejected ballots		unknown		
Turnout		12,114	78.57	+3.35
Eligible voters/turnout		15,419		
Government (Unionist) gain from Conservative		Swing		+3.11
Source: Library of Parliament

1921 Canadian federal election: Cumberland
Party	Candidate	Votes	%	±%
Liberal	Hance James Logan	9,762	56.55	+11.49
Conservative	Charles Edward Bent	4,407	25.53	–
Progressive	James Anderson Mackinnon	3,094	17.92	–
Total valid votes		17,263	100.00	
Total rejected ballots		unknown		
Turnout		17,263	71.83	–6.74
Eligible voters/turnout		24,033		
Liberal gain from Government (Unionist)		Swing		+41.04
Source: Library of Parliament

1925 Canadian federal election: Cumberland
Party	Candidate	Votes	%	±%
Conservative	Robert Knowlton Smith	8,492	57.44	+31.92
Liberal	Hance James Logan	6,291	42.56	–13.99
Total valid votes		14,783	100.00	
Total rejected ballots		unknown		
Turnout		14,783	69.27	–2.56
Eligible voters/turnout		21,341		
Conservative gain from Liberal		Swing		+31.92
Source: Library of Parliament
