= Edgar Nelson Rhodes =

Premier of Nova Scotia from 1925 to 1930

The Honourable Edgar Nelson Rhodes PC
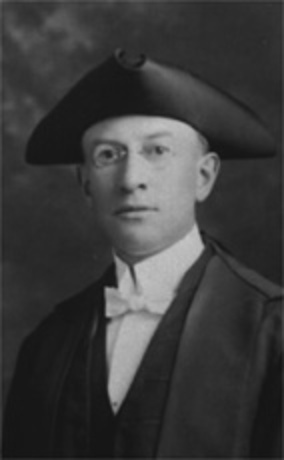

10th Premier of Nova Scotia
- In office July 16, 1925 – August 11, 1930
- Monarch: George V
- Lieutenant Governor: James Robson Douglas; James Cranswick Tory
- Preceded by: Ernest Howard Armstrong
- Succeeded by: Gordon Sidney Harrington

15th Speaker of the House of Commons of Canada
- In office January 18, 1917 – March 5, 1922
- Preceded by: Albert Sévigny
- Succeeded by: Rodolphe Lemieux

Senator for Amherst, Nova Scotia
- In office July 20, 1935 – March 15, 1942
- Appointed by: R. B. Bennett

Member of the Canadian Parliament for Richmond—West Cape Breton
- In office August 11, 1930 – July 20, 1935
- Preceded by: John Alexander Macdonald
- Succeeded by: The electoral district was abolished in 1933.

Member of the Nova Scotia House of Assembly for Hants County
- In office June 25, 1925 – August 11, 1930 Serving with Albert E. Parsons
- Preceded by: James W. Reid; John A. Macdonald
- Succeeded by: Alexander S. MacMillan

Member of the Canadian Parliament for Cumberland
- In office October 26, 1908 – December 6, 1921
- Preceded by: Hance James Logan
- Succeeded by: Hance James Logan

Personal details
- Born: January 5, 1877 Amherst, Nova Scotia
- Died: March 15, 1942 (aged 65) Ottawa, Ontario, Canada
- Party: Conservative Party; Nova Scotia Conservative Party
- Spouse(s): Mary Grace Pipes m, 1905
- Profession: Lawyer
- Cabinet: Federal: Minister of Fisheries (1930–1932); Minister of Finance and Receiver General (1932–1935)

Edgar Nelson Rhodes, PC (January 5, 1877 – March 15, 1942), was a Canadian parliamentarian from Nova Scotia who served as Premier of Nova Scotia from 1925 to 1930.

== Early life and career ==
He was first elected to the House of Commons of Canada in 1908 as a member of the Conservative Party. In January 1917, he became Speaker of the House of Commons of Canada when his predecessor, Albert Sévigny, was appointed to the Canadian Cabinet. Rhodes was retained in the position following the 1917 election that fall, becoming the third Speaker since James Cockburn to preside over more than one Parliament. In 1921, he was made a member of the Queen's Privy Council for Canada before retiring from politics to become president of the British-American Nickel Company, whose previous president had been James Hamet Dunn.

== Premiership ==
The company failed in 1925, and he returned to provincial politics. Prior to the 1925 provincial election, he was asked to become leader of the Nova Scotia Conservative Party after the leader of the party, W. L. Hall, was assaulted on the waterfront. Rhodes took over the party and led it to victory in the 1925 election. The Conservatives defeated a Liberal government that had been in power for forty-three years but had been, in its last years, wracked by an economic downturn and severe labour unrest among miners in Cape Breton.

Rhodes ran on a Maritime Rights platform, promising to curtail federal influence and stop the exodus of people from the province. The Tories more than doubled their seats in the Nova Scotia House of Assembly, winning forty out of forty-three seats. An important factor in their victory was the failure of the governing Liberals to resolve a long strike by the province's coal miners. When Cape Breton coal miner William Davis was killed by company police in a confrontation on June 11, voters looked to the Tories for solutions. Rhodes engineered a settlement of the dispute and appointed a royal commission. The new government later introduced pensions for teachers and allowances for widowed mothers.

During its first term, the government eliminated the requirement for newly-appointed ministers to run for re-election in 1927.

=== Abolition of the Legislative Council ===
The Legislative Council, the province's appointed upper house, dated from 1838 and was meant to mimic the imperial House of Lords. It had, however, been the source of constant criticism from 1870, and every government since 1878 had promised or at least supported its abolition. The Council had been normally sized at 21 members prior to confederation, and the British North America Act 1867 provided for the continuation of provincial constitutions. Failing to further specify anything on such constitutions, the Act left doubt as to whether the Council was therefore limited to the customary 21 members, the 18 members actually empanelled at the time of the Act, or as many members as the Sovereign, however represented in Nova Scotia, wished. Further statutes of the provincial constitution continued this confusion. Similar equivocation existed as to whether appointments to the Council were for life or the mere pleasure of the Sovereign.

Partisan politics also played a role in this issue, with Liberals largely yielding to the Council's presence as it was able to help the party organization and Tories opposing it for that reason. Liberal George Henry Murray, premier from 1896 to 1923, nominally supported its abolition but introduced only half-hearted measures to that end, and when money was ample enough to afford the second chamber he and the Liberal press largely supported its continuation. By 1923, the communist J. B. McLachlan stoked enough fear that the Council was able to position itself as the last barrier to his activities. Murray's successor Armstrong reformed the Council by limiting future appointees to ten-year terms in 1925, but achieved little else.

By the time of Rhodes's assumption of office, only one Conservative was on the Council. The new government declined to fill vacancies in the Council lest the new officeholders become too attached to its continued existence. It appointed F. P. Bligh to represent it in the Council in 1926, making him its President in 1927, and appointed R. H. Butts to be the government leader; those were the only two appointments of the government to the Council that were not for the express purpose of securing its abolition. Rhodes attempted to pay off the councillors in 1926, with ten-year pensions to those appointed for life and five-year pensions to those appointed for ten years, but the offer was rejected. After this failure, Rhodes advised the Lieutenant-Governor James Cranswick Tory to appoint enough Councillors to vote the body out of existence, arguing that the Sovereign, duly represented by the Lieutenant-Governor in Nova Scotia, continued to have the right to appoint an unlimited number of persons to the Council. Tory referred the matter to the federal Governor General in Council, who told him to limit the appointments to 21 total councillors pending further judicial review.

After this second setback, the government introduced a bill in 1926, and another in 1927, to abolish the Council; unlikely to pass, they were to absolve the government of any blame for the Council's continued existence. After these setbacks, and considering taking the issue to a provincial referendum, the government ultimately appealed to the imperial Judicial Committee of the Privy Council, where it won a total victory; not only was the Sovereign, and by extension the Lieutenant Governor in Council, able to appoint as many Legislative Councillors as desired, but also that such councillors served at pleasure if appointed prior to the 1925 statute. Now at the mercy of Rhodes after having ironically declined a written constitution, the Council offered its abolition but Rhodes declined. The Council had at this point 17 members; six of them were appointed under the 1925 statute and were thus immune from the executive, whereas two were Conservatives, A. W. Redden and W. H. Owen, who were allowed to keep their seats despite Owen's lack of a formal pledge to support abolition. The remaining nine were Liberals who, despite their pledged support for abolition were ordered to resign or face dismissal; three resigned and six were dismissed.

The government appointed 14 new Tories, bringing the Council to 22 for the first time; in addition to the symbolism, this number allowed every county to take part of the abolition. Lest any appointees go rogue and become attached to their legislative role, the government ensured that very little legislative work would happen in 1928, whose session was primarily occupied by partying and feasting. Bligh gave the farewell speech, ending it with "sic transitur gloria mundi", which was drowned out by the revelry. The councillors adopted the motto of "let us eat and drink, for tomorrow we die" for their final day in office.

=== Second term ===
The Rhodes government was re-elected in 1928 with a reduced majority.

Having criticized prohibition in 1927, Rhodes scheduled a referendum on the topic for October 31, 1929. The referendum resulted in the discontinuance of outright prohibition in favour of government control of liquor sales.

John Francis Mahoney, the Minister for Natural Resources, died in a car accident on September 2, 1929. After that point, the government's majority was only two, and Rhodes opened a by-election in December to confirm the placement of George H. Murphy, Mahoney's successor as minister, in the seat that Mahoney had been narrowly elected to in the general election. Rhodes took the by-election as a referendum on his government's mandate, and had waited until December to drop the writ to capitalize on the success of the referendum and internal division in the Liberal leadership.

Murphy won the election, which happened on January 21, with a sizeable majority. Rhodes thus had the necessary confidence to retain office until the government's term expired in 1933. However, he himself would not be premier for that duration, as the Conservatives would regain federal office in August and have the new prime minister R. B. Bennett appoint him to be the new Minister of Fisheries at Ottawa. Rhodes chose Gordon Sidney Harrington as his successor at Halifax.

== Federal government ==
He returned to federal politics to become Minister of Fisheries under Prime Minister R.B. Bennett. From 1932 to 1935, he served as federal Finance Minister, and, despite the Great Depression, handed down austere budgets that increased taxes and reduced spending.

== Senate and later life ==
He was appointed to the Senate of Canada three months before the 1935 federal election that routed Bennett's government. He remained a Senator until his death in 1942 in Ottawa. He is buried in Ottawa's Beechwood Cemetery.

On July 12, 1905, he married Mary Grace Pipes, daughter of William Thomas Pipes, Rhodes' law partner and Premier of Nova Scotia from 1882 to 1884. They had one son, Edgar Nelson, and one daughter, Helen Sybil.

== Electoral record ==
1908 Canadian federal election: Cumberland
| Party | Candidate | Votes | % | ±% |
|---|---|---|---|---|
| Conservative | Edgar Nelson Rhodes | 4,800 | 52.69 | +6.91 |
| Liberal | James Ralston | 4,310 | 47.31 | –6.91 |
| Total valid votes | | 9,110 | 100.00 | |
| Total rejected ballots | | unknown | | |
| Turnout | | 9,110 | 74.03 | –4.65 |
| Eligible voters/turnout | | 12,306 | | |
| Conservative gain from Liberal | | Swing | | +6.91 |
Source: Library of Parliament

1911 Canadian federal election: Cumberland
| Party | Candidate | Votes | % | ±% |
|---|---|---|---|---|
| Conservative | Edgar Nelson Rhodes | 4,780 | 51.83 | –0.86 |
| Liberal | Hance James Logan | 4,442 | 48.17 | +0.86 |
| Total valid votes | | 9,222 | 100.00 | |
| Total rejected ballots | | unknown | | |
| Turnout | | 9,222 | 75.22 | +1.19 |
| Eligible voters/turnout | | 12,260 | | |
| Conservative hold | | Swing | | –0.86 |
Source: Library of Parliament

1917 Canadian federal election: Cumberland
| Party | Candidate | Votes | % | ±% |
|---|---|---|---|---|
| Government (Unionist) | Edgar Nelson Rhodes | 6,655 | 54.94 | +3.11 |
| Opposition | Hance James Logan | 5,459 | 45.06 | –3.11 |
| Total valid votes | | 12,114 | 100.00 | |
| Total rejected ballots | | unknown | | |
| Turnout | | 12,114 | 78.57 | +3.35 |
| Eligible voters/turnout | | 15,419 | | |
| Government (Unionist) gain from Conservative | | Swing | | +3.11 |
Source: Library of Parliament

1921 Canadian federal election: Cumberland
| Party | Candidate | Votes | % | ±% |
|---|---|---|---|---|
| Liberal | Hance James Logan | 9,762 | 56.55 | +11.49 |
| Conservative | Charles Edward Bent | 4,407 | 25.53 | – |
| Progressive | James Anderson Mackinnon | 3,094 | 17.92 | – |
| Total valid votes | | 17,263 | 100.00 | |
| Total rejected ballots | | unknown | | |
| Turnout | | 17,263 | 71.83 | –6.74 |
| Eligible voters/turnout | | 24,033 | | |
| Liberal gain from Government (Unionist) | | Swing | | +41.04 |
Source: Library of Parliament

== Works cited ==
- Beck, James Murray (1957). Dawson, R. MacG. (ed.). The Government of Nova Scotia. Toronto: University of Toronto Press – via Internet Archive.
