= William Thomas Pipes =

Canadian politician

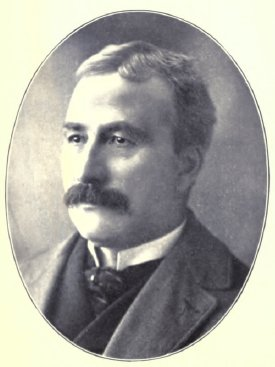

6th Premier of Nova Scotia
- In office August 3, 1882 – July 15, 1884
- Monarch: Victoria
- Lieutenant Governor: Adams George Archibald; Matthew Henry Richey
- Preceded by: John Thompson
- Succeeded by: William Stevens Fielding

MLA for Cumberland County
- In office June 20, 1882 – June 15, 1886 Serving with Charles J. Townshend, Thomas R. Black
- Preceded by: Charles J. Townshend; Edward Vickery
- Succeeded by: Richard L. Black
- In office June 20, 1906 – October 7, 1909 Serving with Elisha B. Paul
- Preceded by: Thomas R. Black; Elisha B. Paul; Daniel McLeod
- Succeeded by: Joshua H. Livingston

Personal details
- Born: April 15, 1850 Amherst, Nova Scotia
- Died: October 7, 1909 (aged 59) Boston, Massachusetts
- Party: Liberal
- Spouse: Ruth Eliza McElmon (m. 1876)
- Children: 3 daughters
- Education: Amherst Academy
- Occupation: Lawyer, and businessman
- Profession: Politician

William Thomas Pipes (April 15, 1850 – October 7, 1909) was a politician in Nova Scotia, Canada.

== Biography ==
Pipes was born in Amherst, Nova Scotia. He ran in the 1878 federal election against Charles Tupper, but was unable to wrest away Tupper's seat in the House of Commons of Canada. In 1882, Pipes ran as a Liberal candidate in the provincial election and won a seat.

The Liberals unexpectedly won the most seats in the legislature despite the fact that they had no leader. William S. Fielding was at the time editor of the Halifax Morning Chronicle and could have become premier, but declined due to his lack of financial resources.

The caucus selected Pipes to lead the party and become the sixth Premier. The position was an unpaid one at the time, so Pipes had to continue his law practice. Pipes served as premier for two years, but was hobbled by personal problems and the need to earn a living. He induced Fielding to enter cabinet, and they became close collaborators.

The principal policy objective of the Pipes government was to secure a transfer of the Pictou railway line from the federal government to the province and to purchase and complete the privately owned "Eastern Extension Railway". The federal and provincial governments were unable to agree on a price, and the Pipes government abandoned the project. The Pipes government also tried to get financial assistance from Ottawa, but was unsuccessful, and was forced to cut government spending.

Pipes' personal situation became increasingly untenable, and his relations with his cabinet (aside from Fielding) were frayed. On July 15, 1884, Pipes resigned as Premier, and nominated Fielding as his successor.

Pipes broke with Fielding in 1886, however, as Fielding moved for the province's secession from Canadian Confederation due to the federal government's neglect of the province's demands. During that year's election, Pipes referred to Fielding's campaign as "the putrid carcass of repeal".

In 1887, Pipes again attempted to win a seat in the federal House of Commons, but again failed to dislodge Tupper. In 1906, he returned to provincial politics, and served as Attorney-General in the cabinet of Premier George Henry Murray until his death in Boston.

Pipes was involved in business as director of Amherst Boot and Shoe Manufacturing Co, a large shareholder in the Rhodes Curry Company, and director and secretary of the Nova Scotia Lumber Company. He held these positions during his time as a provincial cabinet minister.
