= 1901 Nova Scotia general election =

Canadian provincial election

← 1897	October 2, 1901	1906 →

38 seats of the Nova Scotia House of Assembly 20 seats needed for a majority
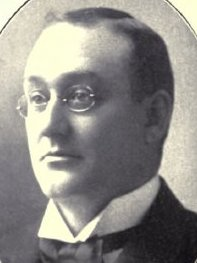
	First party	Second party
		Con
Leader	George Henry Murray	Charles Smith Wilcox
Party	Liberal	Liberal-Conservative
Leader since	1896	1898
Leader's seat	Victoria	Hants (Lost re-election)
Last election	35	3
Seats won	36	2
Seat change	▲1	▼1
Popular vote	80,196	55,889
Percentage	58.79%	40.97%
Swing	▲3.22pp	▼3.06pp
Premier before election
George Henry Murray
Liberal
Premier after election
George Henry Murray
Liberal

The 1901 Nova Scotia general election was held on 2 October 1901 to elect members of the 33rd House of Assembly of the province of Nova Scotia, Canada. It was won by the Liberal party.

== Results ==
=== Results by party ===
↓
36	2
Liberal	Liberal-Conservative

Official results
Party	Party leader	# of candidates	Seats				Popular vote		
Party	Party leader	# of candidates	1897	Dissolution	Elected	Change	#	%	Change (pp)
Liberal	George Henry Murray	40	35	34	36	+1	80,196	58.79%	+3.22%
Liberal-Conservative	Charles Smith Wilcox	32	3	4	2	-1	55,889	40.97%	-3.06%
Independent/Other		1	0	0	0	0	326	0.24%	-0.16%
Vacant				0					
Total valid votes							136,411	100.00%	–
Blank and invalid ballots							0	0.00%	–
Total		73	38	38	38	–	136,411	100.00%	–

Popular vote
Liberal	58.79%
Liberal-Conservative	40.97%
Independent/Other	0.24%

Seats summary
Liberal	94.74%
Liberal-Conservative	5.26%

== Retiring incumbents ==
Liberal

- Charles Edward Church, Lunenburg
- William A. Ferguson, Guysborough
- Alexander E. Fraser, Cumberland
- Thomas Keillor, Queens
- John Drew Sperry, Lunenburg

Liberal-Conservative

- Matthew Henry Fitzpatrick, Pictou
- Thomas McMullen, Colchester

== Nominated candidates ==
1901 Nova Scotia Provincial Election

Legend
bold denotes party leader
† denotes an incumbent who is not running for re-election or was defeated in nomination contest

=== Valley ===
Electoral district	Candidates			Incumbent
Electoral district	Liberal	Liberal-Conservative	Independent/Other	Incumbent
Annapolis	James Wilberforce Longley; 1,825; 29.60%	W. C. Healey; 1,348; 21.87%		James Wilberforce Longley
Annapolis	Joseph A. Bancroft; 1,750; 28.39%	Frank Andrews; 1,242; 20.15%		Joseph A. Bancroft
Digby	Ambroise-Hilaire Comeau; 1,507; 37.12%	J. K. Tobin; 611; 15.05%		Ambroise-Hilaire Comeau
Digby	Angus Morrison Gidney; 1,400; 34.48%	Louis Dugas; 542; 13.35%		Angus Morrison Gidney
Hants	Arthur Drysdale; 2,092; 29.54%	A. S. Sanford; 1,458; 20.58%		Arthur Drysdale
Hants	Francis Parker McHeffey; 1,914; 27.02%	**Charles Smith Wilcox**; 1,619; 22.86%		Charles Smith Wilcox
Kings	Brenton Dodge; 2,225; 33.97%	J. W. Ryan; 1,116; 17.04%		Brenton Dodge
Kings	Harry H. Wickwire; 2,122; 32.40%	Peter Innes; 1,087; 16.60%		Harry H. Wickwire

=== South Shore ===
Electoral district	Candidates			Incumbent
Electoral district	Liberal	Liberal-Conservative	Independent/Other	Incumbent
Lunenburg	Edward Doran Davison; 2,932; 28.24%	A. J. Wolfe; 2,335; 22.49%		John Drew Sperry†
Lunenburg	Alexander Kenneth Maclean; 2,923; 28.15%	J. A. Roberts; 2,192; 21.11%		Charles Edward Church†
Queens	Edward Matthew Farrell; 925; 27.95%	John Hutt; 783; 23.66%		Edward Matthew Farrell
Queens	Charles F. Cooper; 843; 25.48%	W. L. Libbey; 758; 22.91%		Thomas Keillor†
Shelburne	Thomas Johnston; 817; 41.98%		Arthur Hood; 326; 16.75%	Thomas Johnston
Shelburne	Thomas Robertson; 803; 41.26%			Thomas Robertson
Yarmouth	Augustus Stoneman; Acclamation			Augustus Stoneman
Yarmouth	Henry S. LeBlanc; Acclamation			Henry S. LeBlanc

=== Fundy-Northeast ===
Electoral district	Candidates			Incumbent
Electoral district	Liberal	Liberal-Conservative	Independent/Other	Incumbent
Colchester	Benjamin Franklin Pearson; 2,169; 25.34%	A. S. Black; 2,151; 25.13%		Thomas McMullen†
Colchester	Frederick Andrew Laurence; 2,185; 25.53%	John Fitzwilliam Stairs; 2,054; 24.%		Frederick Andrew Laurence
Cumberland	Thomas Reuben Black; 2,944; 25.50%	C. R. Smith; 2,720; 23.56%		Thomas Reuben Black
Cumberland	M. L. Tucker; 2,933; 25.41%	Daniel McLeod; 2,946; 25.52%		Alexander E. Fraser†

=== Halifax ===
Electoral district	Candidates			Incumbent
Electoral district	Liberal	Liberal-Conservative	Independent/Other	Incumbent
Halifax	George Mitchell; 4,955; 17.56%	Adam Brown Crosby; 4,707; 16.68%		George Mitchell
Halifax	David McPherson; 5,049; 17.89%	G. M. Campbell; 4,487; 15.90%		David McPherson
Halifax	Michael Edwin Keefe; 4,840; 17.15%	J. J. Stewart; 4,185; 14.83%		Michael Edwin Keefe

=== Central Nova ===
Electoral district	Candidates			Incumbent
Electoral district	Liberal	Liberal-Conservative	Independent/Other	Incumbent
Antigonish	Angus McGillivray; Acclamation			Angus McGillivray
Antigonish	Christopher P. Chisholm; Acclamation			Christopher P. Chisholm
Guysborough	William Whitman; 1,498; 35.79%	John Keating; 620; 14.81%		William Akins Fergusson†
Guysborough	John Howard Sinclair; 1,511; 36.11%	H. T. Harding; 556; 13.29%		John Howard Sinclair
Pictou	Edward Mortimer Macdonald; 3,703; 20.61%	George E. Munro; 3,011; 16.76%		Edward Mortimer Macdonald
Pictou	Robert Dewar; 3,157; 17.57%	Charles Elliott Tanner; 3,186; 17.73%		Charles Elliott Tanner
Pictou	George Patterson; 3,534; 19.67%	William Cameron; 1,377; 7.66%		Matthew Henry Fitzpatrick†

=== Cape Breton ===
Electoral district	Candidates			Incumbent
Electoral district	Liberal	Liberal-Conservative	Independent/Other	Incumbent
Cape Breton	Daniel Duncan McKenzie; 3,840; 32.29%	Colin McKinnon; 2,205; 18.54%		Daniel Duncan McKenzie
Cape Breton	Neil J. Gillis; 3,691; 31.04%	Vincent Mullins; 2,157; 18.14%		Neil J. Gillis
Inverness	James MacDonald; 2,270; 27.39%	Charles Edward McMillan; 1,326; 16.00%		James McDonald
Inverness	J. L. McDougall; 1,317; 15.89%	Charles Edward McMillan; 1,326; 16.00%		James McDonald
Inverness	Moses J. Doucet; 1,734; 20.92%	Daniel McNeil; 1,137; 13.72%		Moses J. Doucet
Inverness	Alexander Macdonald; 504; 6.08%	Daniel McNeil; 1,137; 13.72%		Moses J. Doucet
Richmond	Duncan Finlayson; 1,090; 34.64%	D. G. Stewart; 562; 17.86%		Duncan Finlayson
Richmond	Simon Joyce; 994; 31.59%	Felix Landry; 501; 15.92%		Simon Joyce
Victoria	**George Henry Murray**; 1,177; 37.85%	John A. McDonald; 581; 18.68%		George Henry Murray
Victoria	John Gillis Morrison; 1,023; 32.89%	John J. McCabe; 329; 10.58%		John Gillis Morrison
