= Robert K. Smith =

Robert K. Smith may refer to:

- Robert Kimmel Smith (born 1930), novelist and children's author
- Robert Knowlton Smith (1887–1973), Conservative member of the Canadian House of Commons
