= Daniel J. McLeod =

Canadian politician from Nova Scotia (1849–1930)

Member of the Nova Scotia House of Assembly for Cumberland County
- In office October 2, 1901 – June 19, 1906

Personal details
- Born: October 31, 1849 River John, Nova Scotia
- Died: January 23, 1930 (aged 80) Springhill, Nova Scotia
- Party: Liberal Conservative
- Spouse: Margaret Douglas
- Occupation: businessman, editor, politician

Daniel J. McLeod (October 31, 1849 – January 23, 1930) was a businessman, editor, and political figure in Nova Scotia, Canada. He represented Cumberland County in the Nova Scotia House of Assembly from 1901 to 1906 as a Liberal Conservative member.

McLeod was born in 1849 at River John, Nova Scotia to Hugh and Jane MacDonald McLeod. He married Margaret Douglas. He served as editor of the Cumberland Star for several years and held local office including justice of the peace in 1883, councillor for Cumberland County and town clerk of Springhill, Nova Scotia. McLeod died in 1930 at Springhill, Nova Scotia. He was elected in the 1901 Nova Scotia general election but was unsuccessful in the 1906 Nova Scotia general election.
