= 33rd Nova Scotia general election =

The 33rd Nova Scotia general election may refer to

- the 1901 Nova Scotia general election, the 32nd overall general election for Nova Scotia, for the (due to a counting error in 1859) 33rd General Assembly of Nova Scotia,
- the 1906 Nova Scotia general election, the 33rd overall general election for Nova Scotia, for the 34th General Assembly of Nova Scotia, but considered the 11th general election for the Canadian province of Nova Scotia, or
- the 1993 Nova Scotia general election, the 55th overall general election for Nova Scotia, for the 56th Legislative Assembly of Nova Scotia, but considered the 33rd general election for the Canadian province of Nova Scotia.
