= Joshua H. Livingstone =

Canadian politician from Nova Scotia (1847–1932)

Member of the Nova Scotia House of Assembly for Cumberland County
- In office November 24, 1909 – June 13, 1911

Personal details
- Born: February 17, 1847 Wallace, Nova Scotia
- Died: April 18, 1932 (aged 85) Wentworth Station, Nova Scotia
- Party: Liberal
- Spouse: Augusta Purdy (m. 1874)
- Occupation: merchant, politician

Joshua H. Livingstone (February 17, 1847 – April 18, 1932) was a merchant and political figure in Nova Scotia, Canada. He represented Cumberland County in the Nova Scotia House of Assembly from 1909 to 1911 as a Liberal member. Livingstone was born in 1847 at Wallace, Nova Scotia to Angus and Sarah Livingstone, of Tobermory, Scotland. He married Augusta Purdy on July 21, 1874. He served as a councillor for Cumberland County from 1892 to 1907 and as warden of the county from 1904 to 1907. Livingstone died in 1932 at Wentworth Station, Nova Scotia. He was elected in a by-election on November 24, 1909, did not contest the 1911 elections, and was unsuccessful in the 1916 Nova Scotia general election.
