= Arthur Rupert Dickey =

Canadian politician

The Honourable Arthur Rupert Dickey PC
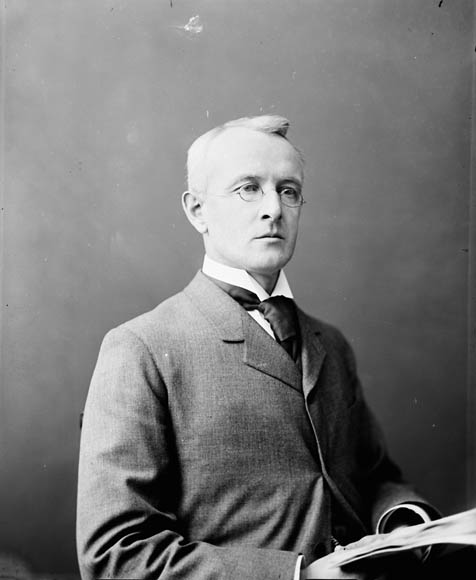

Member of the Canadian Parliament for Cumberland
- In office 1887–1896
- Preceded by: Charles Tupper
- Succeeded by: Hance James Logan

Personal details
- Born: August 18, 1854 Amherst, Nova Scotia, British North America
- Died: July 3, 1900 (aged 45) Amherst, Nova Scotia, Canada
- Party: Conservative
- Cabinet: Secretary of State of Canada (1894–1895); Minister of Militia and Defence (1895–1896); Minister of Justice and Attorney General of Canada (1896)

Arthur Rupert Dickey, PC (August 18, 1854 – July 3, 1900) was a Canadian politician.

Born in Amherst, Nova Scotia, the son of Robert Barry Dickey, he was a lawyer before being elected to the House of Commons of Canada in an 1888 by-election in the riding of Cumberland after Charles Tupper was named High Commissioner for Canada in the United Kingdom. A Conservative, he was re-elected in 1891 and 1896. He was Minister of Justice and Attorney General of Canada, Minister of Militia and Defence, and Secretary of State of Canada.

He died by drowning at Amherst, Nova Scotia on July 3, 1900.

== Electoral record ==
By-election on 13 July 1888 On Mr. Tupper being named High Commissioner for Canada in the United Kingdom, 23 May 1888
Party	Candidate	Votes
Conservative	Arthur Rupert Dickey	2,491
Unknown	C.R. Casey	1,727

By-election on 26 December 1888 On election being declared void
Party	Candidate	Votes
Conservative	Arthur Rupert Dickey	2,479
Unknown	Elderkin	1,431

1891 Canadian federal election: Cumberland
Party	Candidate	Votes	%	±%
Conservative	Arthur Rupert Dickey	2,935	55.03	+0.52
Liberal	D.S. Howard	2,095	39.28	–2.17
Progressive	C.R. Casey	303	5.68	–
Total valid votes		5,333	100.00	
Total rejected ballots		unknown		
Turnout		5,333	65.87	–19.32
Eligible voters/turnout		8,096		
Conservative hold		Swing		–0.83
Source: Library of Parliament

By-election on 30 January 1892 On Mr. Dickey being unseated, 22 December 1891
Party	Candidate	Votes
Conservative	Arthur Rupert Dickey	acclaimed

By-election on 15 January 1895 On Mr. Dickey being named Secretary of State for Canada, 21 December 1894
Party	Candidate	Votes
Conservative	Arthur Rupert Dickey	acclaimed

1896 Canadian federal election: Cumberland
Party	Candidate	Votes	%	±%
Liberal	Hance James Logan	3,462	51.14	+11.86
Conservative	Arthur Rupert Dickey	3,307	48.86	–6.18
Total valid votes		6,769	100.00	
Total rejected ballots		unknown		
Turnout		6,769	70.33	+4.46
Eligible voters/turnout		9,624		
Liberal gain from Conservative		Swing		+11.86
Source: Library of Parliament
