= James W. Kirkpatrick =

Canadian politician from Nova Scotia (1863–1928)

Member of the Nova Scotia House of Assembly for Cumberland County
- In office June 20, 1916 – July 26, 1920

Personal details
- Born: November 6, 1863 Kirkhill, Nova Scotia
- Died: August 20, 1928 (aged 64) Parrsboro, Nova Scotia
- Party: Liberal Conservative
- Spouse: Mary Elderkin
- Occupation: lumberman, merchant, shipbuilder, politician

James W. Kirkpatrick (November 6, 1863 – August 20, 1928) was a lumberman, merchant, shipbuilder, and political figure in Nova Scotia, Canada. He represented Cumberland County in the Nova Scotia House of Assembly from 1916 to 1920 as a Liberal Conservative member.

Kirkpatrick was born in 1863 at Kirkhill, Nova Scotia, near Parrsboro, Nova Scotia, to Thomas Kirkpatrick and Ellen Corbett. He married Mary Elderkin of Advocate, Nova Scotia. He served as a member of the Cumberland County Council. Kirkpatrick died in 1928 at Parrsboro, Nova Scotia. He was elected in the 1916 Nova Scotia general election but did not contest the 1920 Nova Scotia general election.
