= Grace Dean Rogers =

Canadian novelist and historian (1863–1958)

- Born: Grace Dean McLeod; April 19, 1863; Westfield, Nova Scotia
- Died: October 20, 1958 (aged 95); Toronto, Ontario, Canada
- Occupations: Novelist, historian
- Spouse: Henry Wyckoff Rogers (m. 1891–1942)
- Children: 4
- Writing career
- Period: 19th century–20th century
- Genres: Historical fiction, history

Grace Dean Rogers (née McLeod; April 19, 1863 – October 20, 1958) was a Canadian novelist and historian.

== Biography ==
Rogers was born in Westfield, Nova Scotia, in the county of Queen's. Her parents were Arthur James McLeod, a lawyer and Eunice Dean Waterman. Her grandfather was a journalist who wrote for the Novascotian. She was one of five sisters all of whom were sent to university. Rogers achieved a bachelor's degree at Dalhousie University. After researching local folktales and stories, she published her first book, Tales of the Land of Evangeline in 1890. In 1891, she married Henry Rogers and focused her time on raising four sons.

After her children were older, she began writing again, publishing her second book, a history of Nova Scotian Baptists, One Hundred Years With the Baptists in Amherst in 1911. She co-authored the book with her church priest, D. A. Steele. She was the first woman to be elected to the Acadia University board of governors and she was the first woman member of the Nova Scotia Historical Society. In 1911, she was awarded an honorary Master's of Arts by Acadia University for her contributions to literature and Nova Scotia history. In 1955 she was awarded an honorary doctorate by Acadia for significant contributions to Nova Scotia.

In 1920, she ran as a candidate in the provincial election as the Conservative candidate in the riding of Cumberland. Although she finished 7th in a field of nine candidates, she was the first woman to run for political office in Nova Scotia.

In 1938, she and her husband moved to Kingston, Ontario to be near their son, Norman McLeod Rogers, who was an MP and a cabinet minister in the government of William Lyon Mackenzie King. She died in 1958 in Toronto, Ontario, at the age of 95.

== Works ==
- Tales of the Land of Evangeline, (1890), (USA title: Stories of the Land of Evangeline)
- One Hundred Years With the Baptists in Amherst, (1911) with Reverend D. A. Steele
- Letters from my Home in India, (1917) (Editor)
- Joan at Halfway, (1919)
- The Bread of Wickedness, (1925)
- Louisburg, (1928)
- The Secret of Van Royen's Farm, (1929)
- Pioneer Missionaries in the Atlantic Provinces, (1930)
- Raymond's Inheritance, (1937)
