= Robert Coates (politician) =

Canadian politician

The Honourable Robert Coates PC QC
- Official 1984 portrait

Minister of National Defence
- In office September 17, 1984 – February 12, 1985
- Prime Minister: Brian Mulroney
- Preceded by: Jean-Jacques Blais
- Succeeded by: Erik Nielsen (acting)

Member of Parliament for Cumberland Cumberland—Colchester North; (1968–1979) Cumberland—Colchester; (1979–1988)
- In office June 10, 1957 – November 20, 1988
- Preceded by: Azel Randolph Lusby
- Succeeded by: Bill Casey

Personal details
- Born: Robert Carman Coates; March 10, 1928 Amherst, Nova Scotia, Canada
- Died: January 12, 2016 (aged 87) Halifax, Nova Scotia, Canada
- Party: Progressive Conservative
- Spouse: Mary Blanche Wade (m. 1954)
- Children: 2
- Education: Mount Allison University (BA); Dalhousie Law School (LLB, LLD)
- Profession: Author; Barrister; Lawyer

Robert Carman Coates PC QC (March 10, 1928 – January 12, 2016) was a Canadian politician and Cabinet minister.

== Early life and education ==
Coates was born in Amherst, Nova Scotia.

In 1951 Coates received a Bachelor of Arts in Political Science from Mount Allison University in nearby Sackville, New Brunswick. In 1954, Coates graduated from Dalhousie Law School in Halifax. Prior to his election, Coates was a lawyer and member of the Nova Scotia Barristers' Society.

== Political career ==
Coates was first elected to the House of Commons of Canada in the 1957 election as the Progressive Conservative Member of Parliament (MP) for Cumberland, Nova Scotia. Coates was a backbencher during the John Diefenbaker and Joe Clark governments. He was appointed to the Cabinet of Brian Mulroney as Defence Minister following the Tory victory in the 1984 election.

Coates's main initiative was the re-introduction of separate uniforms for the naval, land and air branches of the military. Liberal Paul Hellyer had unified the Royal Canadian Navy, Canadian Army and Royal Canadian Air Force into an integrated Canadian Forces with a single uniform in 1967. Hellyer had scrapped the traditional British style uniforms and ranks of the Canadian Army, Royal Canadian Navy and Royal Canadian Air Force. The new uniforms resembled those of the US air force.

Coates resigned from the Cabinet on February 12, 1985, after it emerged that he visited a strip club during a trip to West Germany in November 1984. Coates did not run in the 1988 election.

== Death ==
Coates died in Halifax on January 12, 2016, after a short illness, at the age of 87.

== Archives ==
There is Robert C. Coates fonds at Library and Archives Canada.

== Electoral record ==
1957 Canadian federal election: Cumberland
Party	Candidate	Votes	%	±%
Progressive Conservative	Robert Coates	10,065	54.51	+6.26
Liberal	Azel Randolph Lusby	8,398	45.49	–6.26
Total valid votes		18,463	99.39	
Total rejected ballots		114	0.61	+0.03
Turnout		18,577	81.42	+9.18
Eligible voters/turnout		22,815		
Progressive Conservative gain from Liberal		Swing		+6.26
Source: Library of Parliament

1958 Canadian federal election: Cumberland
Party	Candidate	Votes	%	±%
Progressive Conservative	Robert Coates	11,379	60.19	+5.68
Liberal	Azel Randolph Lusby	7,525	39.81	–5.68
Total valid votes		18,904	99.41	
Total rejected ballots		113	0.59	–0.02
Turnout		19,017	83.82	+2.40
Eligible voters/turnout		22,688		
Progressive Conservative hold		Swing		+5.68
Source: Library of Parliament

1962 Canadian federal election: Cumberland
Party	Candidate	Votes	%	±%
Progressive Conservative	Robert Coates	9,524	50.74	–9.46
Liberal	H. Keith Russell	7,817	41.64	+1.84
New Democratic	Carson Carlyle Spicer	1,265	6.74	–
Social Credit	John Vincent Forbes	165	0.88	–
Total valid votes		18,771	99.09	
Total rejected ballots		173	0.91	+0.32
Turnout		18,944	87.19	+3.37
Eligible voters/turnout		21,727		
Progressive Conservative hold		Swing		–3.81
Source: Library of Parliament

1963 Canadian federal election: Cumberland
Party	Candidate	Votes	%	±%
Progressive Conservative	Robert Coates	9,034	50.22	–0.52
Liberal	H. Keith Russell	8,082	44.92	+3.28
New Democratic	Carson Carlyle Spicer	874	4.86	–1.88
Total valid votes		17,990	99.51	
Total rejected ballots		89	0.49	–0.42
Turnout		18,079	83.80	–3.39
Eligible voters/turnout		21,573		
Progressive Conservative hold		Swing		+1.38
Source: Library of Parliament

1965 Canadian federal election: Cumberland
Party	Candidate	Votes	%	±%
Progressive Conservative	Robert Coates	9,560	53.18	+2.97
Liberal	C. Elmer Bragg	7,088	39.43	–5.49
New Democratic	Carson Carlyle Spicer	1,327	7.38	+2.52
Total valid votes		17,975	99.31	
Total rejected ballots		125	0.69	+0.20
Turnout		18,100	86.94	+3.14
Eligible voters/turnout		20,818		
Progressive Conservative hold		Swing		–1.26
Source: Library of Parliament

24th Canadian Ministry (1984–1993) – Cabinet of Brian Mulroney
Cabinet post (1)
Predecessor	Office	Successor
Jean-Jacques Blais	Minister of Defence; 1984–1985	Erik Nielsen
