= Gilbert Nelson Allen =

Canadian politician from Nova Scotia (1866–1948)

Member of the Nova Scotia House of Assembly for Cumberland County
- In office July 27, 1920 – June 24, 1925

Personal details
- Born: November 16, 1866 Port Elgin, New Brunswick
- Died: July 31, 1948 (aged 81) Wallace, Nova Scotia
- Party: United Farmers
- Occupation: lobster packer, politician

Gilbert Nelson Allen (November 16, 1866 – July 31, 1948) was a lobster packer and political figure in Nova Scotia, Canada. He represented Cumberland County in the Nova Scotia House of Assembly from 1920 to 1925 as a United Farmers member.

Allen was born in 1866 at Port Elgin, New Brunswick to Gilbert N. Allen. He was married twice. He served as warden of Cumberland County. Allen died in 1948 at Wallace, Nova Scotia. He was elected in the 1920 Nova Scotia general election, and did not contest the 1925 Nova Scotia general election.
