= Robb Engineering =

Robb Engineering was a metals manufacturer that was located in Amherst, Nova Scotia, Canada in the early 1900s. Originally started as a tinsmithy, the factory eventually expanded to the manufacture of boilers, electric engines and small generator plants. Some evidence exists that attempts were also made by the company to design and manufacture locomotive engines as well as a small venture into shipwork.

In 1964 Robb Engineering was acquired by the Dominion Bridge Company. Its assets were merged into Dominion's Canada Car and Foundry subsidiary. These corporate changes saw the workforce at Dominion Bridge Company's operations in Amherst undergo major changes following the dissolution of Robb Engineering.

Robb Engineering gained notoriety during the 1990s after being blamed as the maker of faulty open web steel joists. Poor welds weakened the joists. In some cases the roof joists have experienced catastrophic failure, resulting in at least 1 roof collapse. With the collapse of 3 joists in 3 separate buildings confirmed, an inspection of all governmental structures was conducted in eastern Canada surveying how many of Robb Engineering's joists were being used. Inspections costing into the millions of dollars, found that several thousand government buildings, in several provinces across eastern Canada, were involved. An unknown number of private buildings could also be involved, however no statistical information was recorded reflecting this data.
