= CFTA-FM =

Community radio station in Nova Scotia, Canada

Coordinates: 45°45′40″N 64°09′31″W

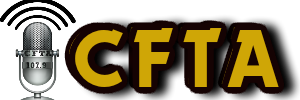
- Amherst, Nova Scotia; Canada
- Frequency: 107.9 MHz
- Branding: Tantramar FM

Programming
- Format: Community Radio

Ownership
- Owner: Tantramar Community Radio Society

History
- First air date: July 21, 2011

Technical information
- Licensing authority: CRTC
- Class: B1
- ERP: 6,500 watts
- HAAT: 123 metres (404 ft)

Links
- Webcast: Listen live
- Website: cftafm.com

CFTA-FM is a community radio station which operates at 107.9 FM in Amherst, Nova Scotia, Canada. The station is branded "Tantramar FM".

== History ==
On September 11, 2008, Tantramar Community Radio Society was denied a licence to operate a new community radio station at Amherst. On June 15, 2009, Tantramar Community Radio Society received Canadian Radio-television and Telecommunications Commission (CRTC) approval to operate a new FM community radio station at Amherst. The new station would operate at 107.9 MHz (channel 300B1), with an effective radiated power of 6,500 watts (non-directional antenna/effective height of antenna above average terrain of 123 metres).

On July 21, 2011, at 1:07pm, CFTA-FM 107.9 signed on the air with a test broadcast.
