= Elisha B. Paul =

Canadian politician from Nova Scotia (1858–)

Member of the Nova Scotia House of Assembly for Cumberland County
- In office December 15, 1904 – June 13, 1911

Personal details
- Born: July 21, 1858 Amherst, Nova Scotia
- Party: Liberal
- Spouse: Lavinia F. Shields (m. 1880)
- Occupation: miner, politician

Elisha B. Paul (July 21, 1858 – unknown) was a miner and political figure in Nova Scotia, Canada. He represented Cumberland County in the Nova Scotia House of Assembly from 1904 to 1911 as a Liberal member. Paul was born in 1858 at Amherst, Nova Scotia to John and Caroline Jackson Paul. He married Lavinia F. Shields on January 13, 1880. He served as a town councillor for Springhill, Nova Scotia. He was elected in a by-election on December 15, 1904, re-elected in the 1906 Nova Scotia general election, and did not contest the 1911 Nova Scotia general election.
