= William Oxley (Canadian politician) =

Canadian politician from Nova Scotia (19th century)

Member of the Nova Scotia House of Assembly for Cumberland County
- In office May 21, 1890 – March 14, 1894

Personal details
- Party: Liberal-Conservative
- Occupation: manufacturer, politician

William Oxley (unknown – unknown) was a manufacturer and political figure in Nova Scotia, Canada. He represented Cumberland County in the Nova Scotia House of Assembly from 1890 to 1894 as a Liberal Conservative member. He was elected in the 1890 Nova Scotia general election but was unsuccessful in the 1894 Nova Scotia general election.
