= Thomas Keillor =

Canadian politician

Thomas Keillor (July 1, 1828 – February 5, 1907) was a farmer, Baptist minister and political figure in Nova Scotia. He represented Queens County in the Nova Scotia House of Assembly from 1897 to 1901 as a Liberal member.

He was born in Amherst Point, Nova Scotia, the son of Robert Thompson Keillor and Elethusia "Elsie" Dobson. Keillor was married three times: to Emeline Freeman on 3 February 1865, at Milton, Queens, Nova Scotia; then to widow Lydia Eliza Barteaux (née Harris) on 31 October 1899, at Nictaux Falls, Annapolis; and finally to the widow Caroline "Carrie" Nickerson (née Jones) on 27 January 1905 at Liverpool, Queens. On 5 February 1907, Keillor died in Buffalo, New York, after going there to seek medical treatment a few weeks prior. He was buried in Maple Grove Cemetery, Kempt, Queens. (He did not appear to have any children of his own.)
