= John S. Smiley =

Canadian politician

MLA for Cumberland
- In office 1933–1937
- Preceded by: Archibald Terris; Daniel George McKenzie
- Succeeded by: Archie B. Smith

Personal details
- Born: January 20, 1885 Milltown, New Brunswick
- Died: August 21, 1945 (aged 60) Halifax, Nova Scotia
- Party: Nova Scotia Liberal Party
- Occupation: lawyer

John Stanley Smiley (January 20, 1885 – August 21, 1945) was a Canadian politician. He represented the electoral district of Cumberland in the Nova Scotia House of Assembly from 1933 to 1937. He was a member of the Nova Scotia Liberal Party.

Smiley was born in 1885 at Milltown, New Brunswick. He was educated at Mount Allison University and Dalhousie University, and was a lawyer by profession. He married Celia Ganong Kierstead in 1909. Smiley first attempted to enter provincial politics in the 1928 election, but was defeated. He ran again in 1933, and was elected in the dual-member Cumberland County riding with Conservative Percy Chapman Black. In the 1937 election, Smiley was defeated by the two Conservative candidates, Black and Archie B. Smith. In 1938, Smiley was appointed a judge of the Nova Scotia Supreme Court. Smiley died at Halifax on August 21, 1945.
