= Amherst News =

Canadian weekly newspaper in Nova Scotia

Amherst News - Citizen Record
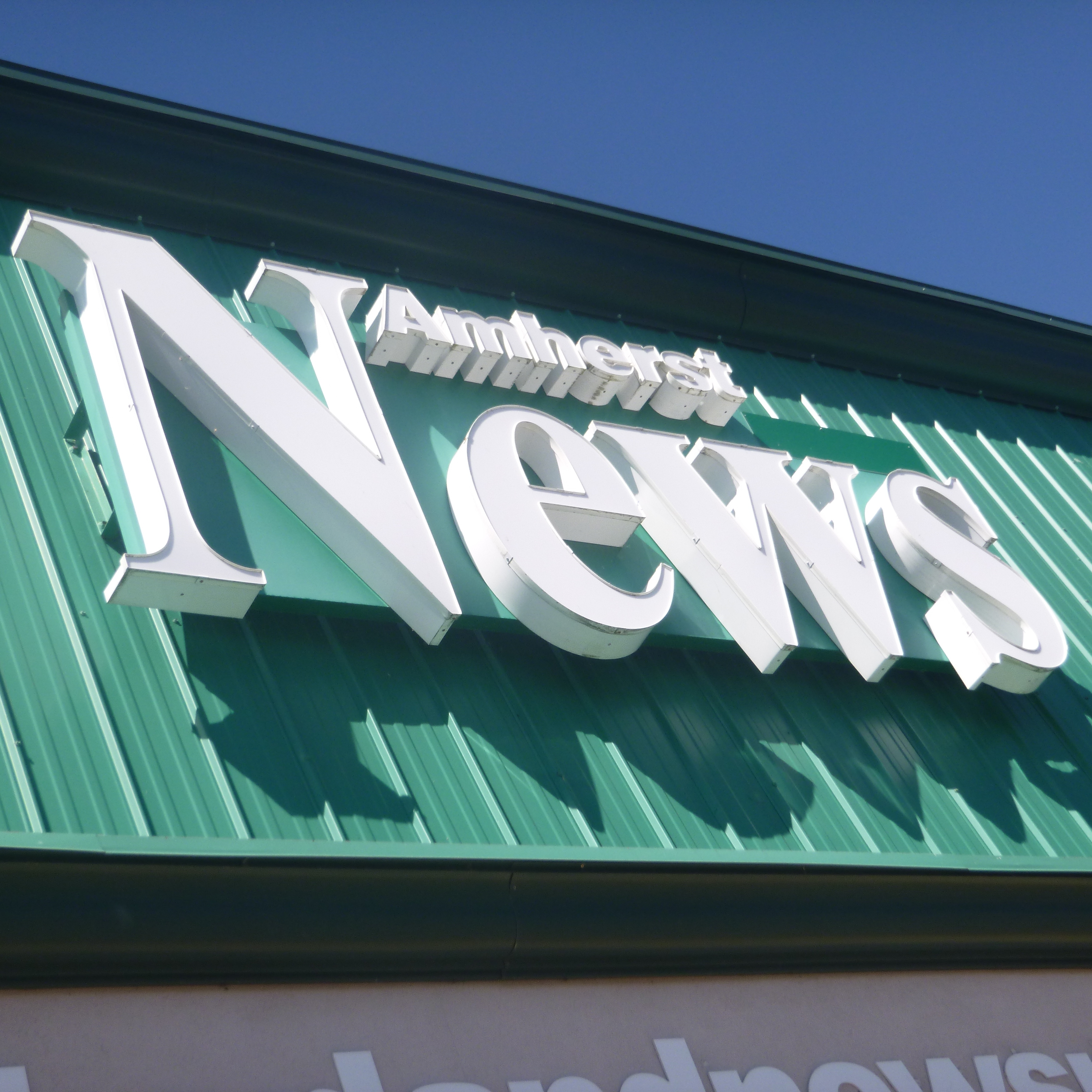
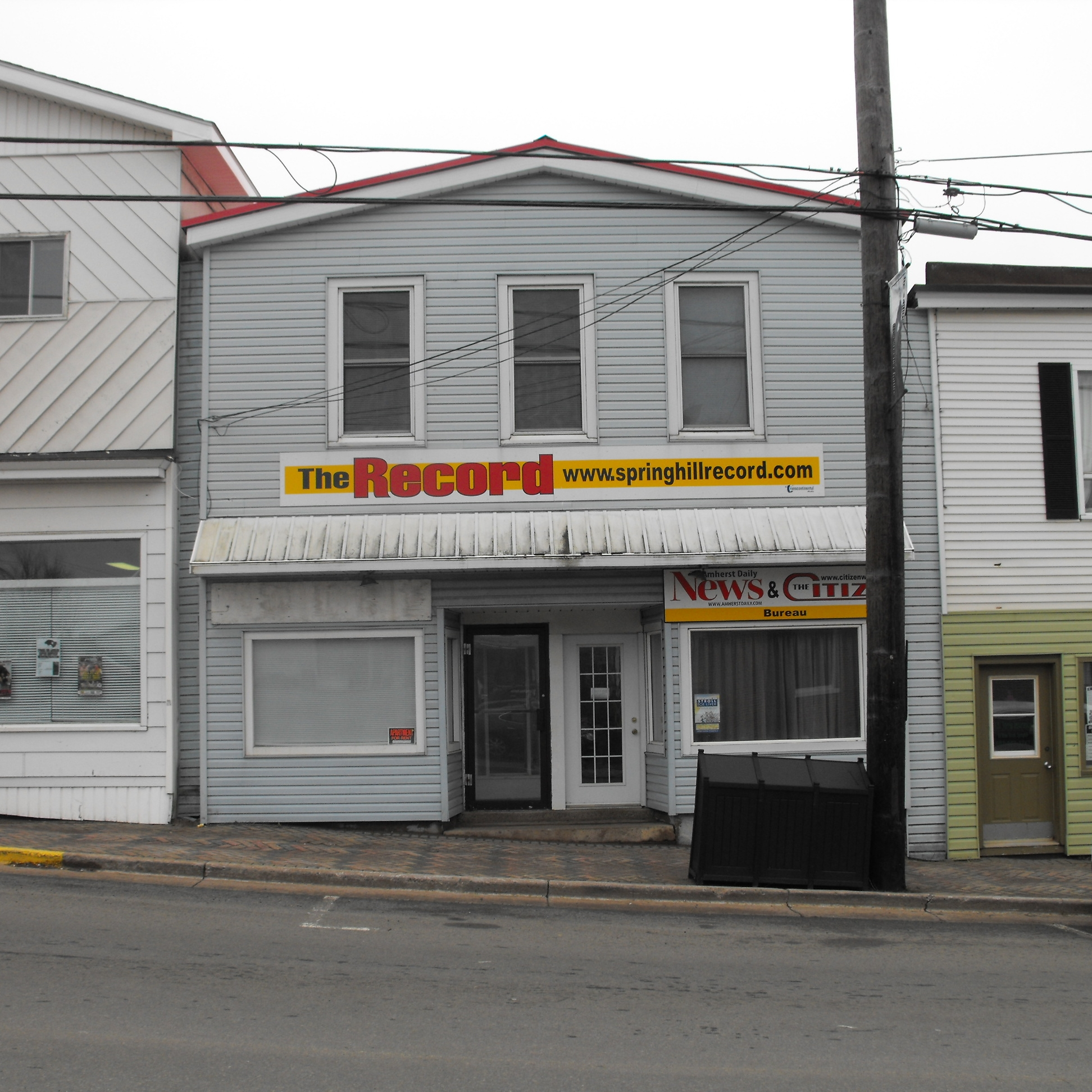
- Amherst News - Citizen Record / Springhill Record building, Springhill, Nova Scotia
- Type: Weekly newspaper
- Format: Tabloid
- Owner: SaltWire Network
- Founded: 2013
- Language: English
- Headquarters: Amherst, Nova Scotia; B4H 2X2
- Circulation: 3828 (2008)
- Website: www.cumberlandnewsnow.com

The Amherst News - Citizen Record is a weekly newspaper serving Cumberland County, Nova Scotia. The paper was launched in 2013 when two weekly community papers, Amherst News and Citizen Record were merged replacing the daily newspaper The Amherst Daily News. It has a circulation of under 3,828. Its sister weekly publication is the Springhill Record.
