= Azel Randolph Lusby =

Canadian politician

A. Randolph Lusby

Member of Parliament for Cumberland
- In office August 1953 – June 1957

Personal details
- Born: 23 August 1907 Amherst, Nova Scotia
- Died: 30 August 1995 (aged 88) Amherst, Nova Scotia
- Party: Liberal
- Spouse(s): Jeanne Wainwright (m. 15 December 1951)
- Profession: barrister

Azel Randolph Lusby (23 August 1907 – 30 August 1995) was a Canadian lawyer and politician. Lusby served as a Liberal party member of the House of Commons of Canada. He was born in Amherst, Nova Scotia.

He received his Bachelor of Arts degree at Acadia University, then a Bachelor of Laws at Dalhousie University after which he worked as a barrister. Lusby was the Prosecuting Officer for Cumberland County, Nova Scotia between 1939 and 1953.

Lusby was first elected to Parliament at the Cumberland riding in the 1953 general election. After serving his only federal term, the 22nd Canadian Parliament, he was defeated by Robert Coates of the Progressive Conservative party. Lusby then unsuccessfully tried to unseat Coates in the 1958 election. He died at his Amherst, Nova Scotia home in 1995, aged 88.

1953 Canadian federal election: Cumberland
Party	Candidate	Votes	%	±%
Liberal	Azel Randolph Lusby	8,860	51.74	+7.65
Progressive Conservative	William Harmon Wasson	8,263	48.26	–1.56
Total valid votes		17,123	99.42	
Total rejected ballots		100	0.58	+0.13
Turnout		17,223	72.25	–9.57
Eligible voters/turnout		23,839		
Liberal gain from Progressive Conservative		Swing		+7.65
Source: Library of Parliament
