= Robert Knowlton Smith =

Canadian politician

Member of Parliament for Cumberland
- In office October 1925 – August 1935
- Preceded by: Hance James Logan
- Succeeded by: Kenneth Judson Cochrane

Personal details
- Born: Robert Knowlton Smith; 28 December 1887 Amherst, Nova Scotia
- Died: 26 October 1973 (aged 85) Kitchener, Ontario
- Party: Conservative
- Spouse(s): Ida Lauretta Moss m. 7 June 1911
- Relations: Brother Vincent Reynolds Smith
- Profession: Barrister

Robert Knowlton Smith (28 December 1887 – 26 October 1973) was a Conservative member of the House of Commons of Canada. He was born in Amherst, Nova Scotia and became a barrister.

Smith studied at St. Francis Xavier University and the Dalhousie Law School where in 1911 he graduated with a Bachelor of Laws degree.

He was mayor of Amherst, Nova Scotia in 1923, and served on that municipality's council for five years. In August 1925, he was designated a Crown Prosecutor for Cumberland County, but resigned that October to seek federal office.

He was first elected to Parliament at the Cumberland riding in the 1925 general election, then re-elected there in 1926 and 1930.

On 16 January 1929, he was appointed King's Counsel through the Nova Scotia government.

Smith died on 26 October 1973 and was interred at Parkview Cemetery in Waterloo, Ontario.
