= Thomas McMullen =

Canadian politician

Thomas Gotobed McMullen (January 7, 1844 – October 7, 1925) was a lumber merchant and political figure in Nova Scotia, Canada. He represented Colchester County in the Nova Scotia House of Assembly from 1897 to 1901 as a Liberal-Conservative member.

He was the son of Hugh McMullen and Rebecca Gotobed. McMullen was married twice: to Jessie McConnell in 1867 and then to a widow named Norris. He was leading principal of the Midland Railway, which was later purchased by the Dominion Atlantic Railway. McMullen died in Truro at the age of 81.
