= Westfield, Nova Scotia =

Community in Nova Scotia, Canada

Coordinates: 44°24′49.23″N 65°1′1.52″W

Westfield in Nova Scotia

Westfield is a community in the Canadian province of Nova Scotia, located in the Region of Queens Municipality.
