= Percy Chapman Black =

Canadian politician (1878–1961)

Member of the Canadian Parliament for Cumberland
- In office 1940–1953
- Preceded by: Kenneth Judson Cochrane
- Succeeded by: Azel Randolph Lusby

Personal details
- Born: 11 January 1878 Amherst, Nova Scotia, Canada
- Died: 16 September 1961 (aged 83) Amherst, Nova Scotia, Canada
- Party: National Government (1940–1945), Progressive Conservative Party (1945–1953)
- Occupation: businessman, farmer

Percy Chapman Black (11 January 1878 – 16 September 1961) was a Canadian politician, businessman and farmer. Black served in both the Canadian House of Commons and the Nova Scotia House of Assembly.

Black was the son of J. Hiram Black and Mary Elizabeth "Libbie" Smith and was educated at Amherst College and Mount Allison University. In 1917, he married Jean F. MacDonald. He was elected to the House of Commons of Canada in 1940 as a Member of the coalition National Government to represent the riding of Cumberland. He was a member of a Special Committee on Reconstruction and Re-establishment during the 19th Canadian parliament. He was re-elected as a Progressive Conservative in 1945 and again in 1949.

Prior to his federal political experience, he was elected to the Legislative Assembly of Nova Scotia in 1925 as a Member of the Conservative Party of Nova Scotia to represent the electoral district of Cumberland County. He was appointed Nova Scotia's Minister of Highways. He died in Amherst at the age of 83.

== Electoral record ==
1940 Canadian federal election: Cumberland
| Party | Candidate | Votes | % | ±% |
|---|---|---|---|---|
| National Government | Percy Chapman Black | 8,073 | 46.03 | +2.33 |
| Liberal | Kenneth Judson Cochrane | 8,061 | 45.97 | +2.26 |
| Co-operative Commonwealth | Guy Alton Demings | 1,403 | 8.00 | – |
| Total valid votes | | 17,537 | 99.10 | |
| Total rejected ballots | | 160 | 0.90 | –0.08 |
| Turnout | | 17,697 | 74.34 | –3.32 |
| Eligible voters/turnout | | 23,807 | | |
| National Government gain from Liberal | | Swing | | +24.15 |
Source: Library of Parliament

1945 Canadian federal election: Cumberland
| Party | Candidate | Votes | % | ±% |
|---|---|---|---|---|
| Progressive Conservative | Percy Chapman Black | 9,121 | 46.89 | +0.86 |
| Liberal | Archibald J. Mason | 6,522 | 33.53 | –12.43 |
| Co-operative Commonwealth | John James Crummey | 3,807 | 19.57 | +11.57 |
| Total valid votes | | 19,450 | 99.16 | |
| Total rejected ballots | | 165 | 0.84 | –0.06 |
| Turnout | | 19,615 | 78.18 | +3.84 |
| Eligible voters/turnout | | 25,090 | | |
| Progressive Conservative gain from National Government | | Swing | | +17.23 |
Source: Library of Parliament

1949 Canadian federal election: Cumberland
| Party | Candidate | Votes | % | ±% |
|---|---|---|---|---|
| Progressive Conservative | Percy Chapman Black | 9,850 | 49.82 | +2.92 |
| Liberal | Lawrence Martin Hanway | 8,718 | 44.09 | +10.56 |
| Co-operative Commonwealth | Douglas Haig MacBrien | 1,205 | 6.09 | –13.48 |
| Total valid votes | | 19,773 | 99.55 | |
| Total rejected ballots | | 89 | 0.45 | –0.39 |
| Turnout | | 19,862 | 81.82 | +3.64 |
| Eligible voters/turnout | | 24,275 | | |
| Progressive Conservative hold | | Swing | | +6.74 |
Source: Library of Parliament
