= Kirkhill, Nova Scotia =

Community in Nova Scotia, Canada

Kirkhill
- Kirkhill from Parrsboro in January 2006.

- Location within Nova Scotia
- Coordinates: 45°25′9.8″N 64°21′53.7″W
- Country: Canada
- Province: Nova Scotia
- Municipality: Cumberland County
- Time zone: UTC-4 (AST)
- Postal code: B
- Area code: 902
- Telephone Exchange: 254

Kirkhill is a rural community in Cumberland County, Nova Scotia, northwest of Parrsboro on Route 209. It is reputed that the town's name derives from settler James Kirkpatrick, who settled on "Kirk's Hill" in 1812. A road equipment garage of the Nova Scotia Department of Transportation is located in Kirkhill.
