= Rufus Carter =

Canadian politician

Rufus Seaman Carter (March 31, 1866 – August 29, 1932) was a farmer and political figure in Nova Scotia, Canada. He represented Cumberland County in the Nova Scotia House of Assembly from 1911 to 1920 as a Liberal member.

He was born in Cumberland County, Nova Scotia, the son of William Dobson Carter and Elizabeth Ann Reed. Carter attended the military college in Fredericton, New Brunswick. He went to sea for a time but returned to farming after his father's death. Carter was also involved in the lumber trade with the United States and Great Britain. In 1894, he married Ella Mabel Morris. Carter served several years as a member of the municipal council. Rufus and Ella Carter had two children: Clara, Jean Carter, born December 27, 1898, and Irving Carter, born November 7, 1899.

He was involved in lumbering and coal mining operations and was a Captain in the Nova Scotia Highlanders 93rd Regiment. He was a highly successful marksman and was a member of the Canadian National Rifle Team when it visited England in 1897 to compete in the King's Prize. In that competition he came second and was only one point behind the overall winner. In that same year he attended the Diamond Jubilee of Queen Victoria.

He entered politics in 1907 and was elected as Liberal Councillor for the No. 5 District, Cumberland County, Nova Scotia, a post he won again in 1910. In 1911 he entered and won the Nova Scotia provincial elections alongside his colleague J Layton Ralston. They repeated their win in 1916. In 1921 Rufus Carter was appointed to the Legislative Council of Nova Scotia and held that position until 1928. He was a popular platform speaker at political gatherings and often introduced Sir Wilfrid Laurier.

He had a sonorous voice, was genial and popular and was a member of the Amherst (Maccan) Curling Club and the Order of Oddfellows. His obituaries describe him as being warm-hearted and generous. Large crowds attended his funeral on September 1, 1932. Amongst those attending his funeral were Senator H. J. Logan, R. K. Smith MP, and Angus L. MacDonald, then Leader of the Provincial Liberal Party. His funeral service was conducted by Rev Harris, Anglican Rector of Passboro and Rev. James Baxter of River Herbert. The United Choir sang two selections, and he was buried at the England Cemetery, Amherst. The pallbearers were all members of labour unions from the Maccan and Springhill areas.
