= Nappan =

Community in Nova Scotia, Canada

Coordinates: 45°46′11.92″N 64°14′8.78″W

Nappan in Nova Scotia

Nappan is a community in the Canadian province of Nova Scotia, located in Cumberland County. It is home to Chignecto National Wildlife Area.

The name of the community is derived from the Mi'kmaq word Nepan, meaning "a good place to get camp or wigwam poles". Among the earliest settlers in the area was George Noiles in 1735, who came from Germany.
