= Wentworth Station =

Locality in Nova Scotia, Canada

Coordinates: 45°37′19″N 63°34′24″W

Wentworth Station in Nova Scotia

Wentworth Station is a locality in the Canadian province of Nova Scotia, located in Cumberland County.
