= Richard L. Black =

Canadian politician from Nova Scotia (19th century)

Member of the Nova Scotia House of Assembly for Cumberland County
- In office June 15, 1886 – May 20, 1890

Personal details
- Party: Liberal Conservative
- Spouse: Sarah Gordon
- Occupation: farmer, politician

Richard L. Black (unknown – unknown) was a farmer and political figure in Nova Scotia, Canada. He represented Cumberland County in the Nova Scotia House of Assembly from 1886 to 1890 as a Liberal Conservative member. Black married Sarah Gordon, of River Philip, Nova Scotia. He served as a captain in the Cumberland County militia. He was elected in the 1886 Nova Scotia general election but was unsuccessful in the 1890 Nova Scotia general election.
