= Leonard William Fraser =

Canadian lawyer and political figure

Leonard William Fraser (April 1, 1902 – September 18, 1957) was a Canadian lawyer and political figure in Nova Scotia. He represented Cumberland County in the Nova Scotia House of Assembly from 1940 to 1941 as a Conservative member.

He was born in Amherst, Nova Scotia, the son of Robert McGregor Fraser. Fraser was educated at Dalhousie University. He married Kathleen Blanchet. Fraser was leader of the Opposition in the provincial assembly in 1941. He died in Halifax at the age of 55.
