= Amherst Point =

Community in Nova Scotia, Canada

Coordinates: 45°46′55.67″N 64°17′13.87″W

Amherst Point in Nova Scotia

Amherst Point is a community in the Canadian province of Nova Scotia, located in Cumberland County.
