= Thomas Reuben Black =

Canadian politician

The Hon. Thomas Reuben Black (16 October 1832 – 14 September 1905) was a Canadian politician, senator and farmer from Amherst, Nova Scotia.

Black was educated at Amherst Academy and purchased the family farm where he was an innovative and progressive manager. He also acquired real estate in his home town demonstrating his commitment to the area. In 1860, he married Eunice, the daughter of William W. Bent, a former Nova Scotia MLA.

Black left farming in the 1880s to become involved in politics. He was first elected to the Nova Scotia House of Assembly for Cumberland County in 1884 in a by-election held after Charles James Townshend was elected to the House of Commons. He was re-elected in 1886, then was defeated in 1890. Black was then elected again in 1894, 1897 and 1901. In 1896, he served as a minister without portfolio in the provincial cabinet. He was appointed to the Senate of Canada as a Liberal on 10 June 1904. Black remarried Bethia Clarke in 1905. He died in office.

Black had 4 children of whom two daughters died in their teens and two sons.
