= Charles James Townshend =

Canadian politician

Sir Charles James Townshend, KC (22 March 1844 – 16 June 1924) was a Canadian judge and politician.

== Life and work ==
He was born in Amherst, Nova Scotia, son of the Rev. Canon Townshend, rector of Amherst, and Elizabeth, his wife, daughter of the late honourable Alexander Stewart, C.B., formerly master of the Rolls of the Province of Nova Scotia and judge of the Vice-Admiralty Court. Canon Townshend was the son of the late Honourable William Townshend of Wrexham, England. The family were descended from the Townshends of Norfolk, England.

Charles James Townshend was educated at the Collegiate school, Windsor, Nova Scotia, and subsequently at the University of King's College, Windsor, where he graduated with high honours in 1862. His chief studies were classics, mathematics, and French and German. He took the degree of B.A in 1863, and B.C.L.. in 1872.

In the old Nova Scotia militia, he was gazetted captain 1st Cumberland Regiment in 1863, and the next year was appointed adjutant to the same regiment. He continued an active officer until the change made after Confederation reorganizing the whole system when he retired from further connection with the service.

Townshend was admitted to the bar of the Supreme Court of Nova Scotia in April 1866. He studied law in the office of the Honourable Senator Robert B. Dickey at Amherst. Shortly after Townshend had been admitted to the bar, Senator Dickey retired from practice, and he succeeded to a large and lucrative business. He was a leading counsel in the province for many years and was engaged in all important cases in Cumberland and in some of the adjoining counties.

In 1881, he was appointed by the Dominion government a Queen's Counsel. In 1874, he was nominated by the Liberal-Conservative convention as local candidate for the County of Cumberland. He contested the seat and was defeated by a small majority, owing to an unfortunate split in the Conservative ranks which resulted in three Conservative candidates taking the field. In 1878, he again contested the county for the local seat in conjunction with Sir Charles Tupper, who ran at the same time for the House of Commons, and with him was returned by a majority of nearly 600. The result of the general elections was to defeat the existing administration in Nova Scotia.

On the formation of a Conservative government under Hon. Simon Hugh Holmes, Charles Townshend was made a minister without portfolio. He remained in the government for four years, when, on Mr Holmes' resignation, he was again made a member of the new government, under the Hon. John Sparrow David Thompson, minister of justice. At the general election in 1882, he was again elected for the County of Cumberland. However, the government was defeated and he resigned office along with his colleagues in July 1882. Townshend was one of the leading speakers in opposition to the policy of the new government formed by William Thomas Pipes. On the resignation of Sir Charles Tupper of his seat in the House of Commons in May 1884, Townshend was almost unanimously nominated by the Liberal-Conservatives as their candidate for the Dominion. Subsequently, on June 26, 1884, having resigned his seat in the local House, he was elected to the House of Commons by acclamation. On January 29, 1885, he seconded the Address in answer to the Speech from the Throne and was complimented by both Sir John A. Macdonald and Mr Blake. During the session he spoke on the Franchise bill, taking strong ground against extending the franchise to women, and moved the amendment striking that clause out of the bill, which was carried after a long debate.

He was director of, and solicitor for, the Amherst Boot and Shoe Manufacturing Company, of which he was one of the founders. This business, it may be added, was one of the most successful commercial enterprises in the Maritime provinces. He was solicitor for the Cumberland Coal and Railway Company, the largest colliery in Nova Scotia; and was also solicitor for the Bank of Nova Scotia at Amherst. Mr Townshend admitted J. Medley Townshend, his brother, and Arthur R. Dickey, son of Senator Dickey, into partnership with him in 1878. He was a member of the Masonic order, and of the Grand lodge of Nova Scotia, and was district deputy grand master, and master of Acacia lodge.

In 1875 and 1876, he travelled through Great Britain and visited the principal cities of Europe and the United States. In 1885, he went across the continent to British Columbia.

In church matters, Townshend was an adherent of the Anglican Church of Canada and was appointed delegate both to the diocesan and provincial synods. He married in April 1867, Laura, fourth daughter of John D. Kinnear, judge of Probate for the County of Cumberland. His wife died on 17 March 1884. In 1887 he married again to Lady Margaret MacFarlane. He resided at Amherst except when absent attending sessions of the legislature, or travelling.

Charles James Townshend died in Wolfville on 16 June 1924.
