= Kenneth Judson Cochrane =

Canadian politician

Member of Parliament for Cumberland
- In office October 1941 – June 1949
- Preceded by: Robert Knowlton Smith
- Succeeded by: Percy Chapman Black

Personal details
- Born: 4 August 1896 Fox River, Nova Scotia
- Died: 25 January 1982 (aged 85) Truro, Nova Scotia
- Party: Liberal
- Spouse(s): Gwendolyn Elizabeth Kerr m. 22 Aug 1917
- Profession: Contractor, lumberman, shipbuilder

Kenneth Judson Cochrane (4 August 1896 – 25 January 1982) was a shipbuilder, lumber merchant and political figure in Nova Scotia, Canada. He represented Cumberland in the House of Commons of Canada from 1935 to 1940 as a Liberal member and represented Cumberland in the Nova Scotia House of Assembly from 1941 to 1949 as a Liberal.

He was born in Fox River, Nova Scotia, the son of George Melville Cochrane and Sarah Soley. He was educated at the Ontario Business College in Belleville. He worked for the Canadian Bank of Commerce and as an engineer for the Nova Scotia Department of Highways. In 1917, he married Gwendolyn E. Kerr. Cochrane also served as a member of the municipal council for Port Greville in 1918. He was defeated by Percy Chapman Black when he ran for reelection to the federal seat in 1940. Cochrane served as a lieutenant in the reserves from 1943 to 1944. He died at a Truro, Nova Scotia hospital in 1982.

== Electoral record ==
1935 Canadian federal election: Cumberland
Party	Candidate	Votes	%	±%
Liberal	Kenneth Judson Cochrane	7,473	43.70	–1.83
Conservative	Dara Mason Cochrane	7,158	41.86	–12.61
Reconstruction	Alexander Leadbetter	2,469	14.44	–
Total valid votes		17,100	99.02	
Total rejected ballots		170	0.98	+0.54
Turnout		17,270	77.66	–5.07
Eligible voters/turnout		22,239		
Liberal gain from Conservative		Swing		–7.22
Source: Library of Parliament
