= Alexander E. Fraser =

Canadian politician

Alexander E. Fraser (January 3, 1843 – May 5, 1905) was a merchant and political figure in Nova Scotia, Canada. He represented Cumberland County in the Nova Scotia House of Assembly from 1894 to 1901 as a Liberal member.

He was born in Pictou County, Nova Scotia. Fraser married Elizabeth A. Cochran on February 16, 1882; they had two children, Blanch and Monson. He was involved in both wholesale and retail trade. Fraser was the first mayor of Springhill, Nova Scotia. He died in Springhill at the age of 59.
