= Amherst, Nova Scotia =

- Town
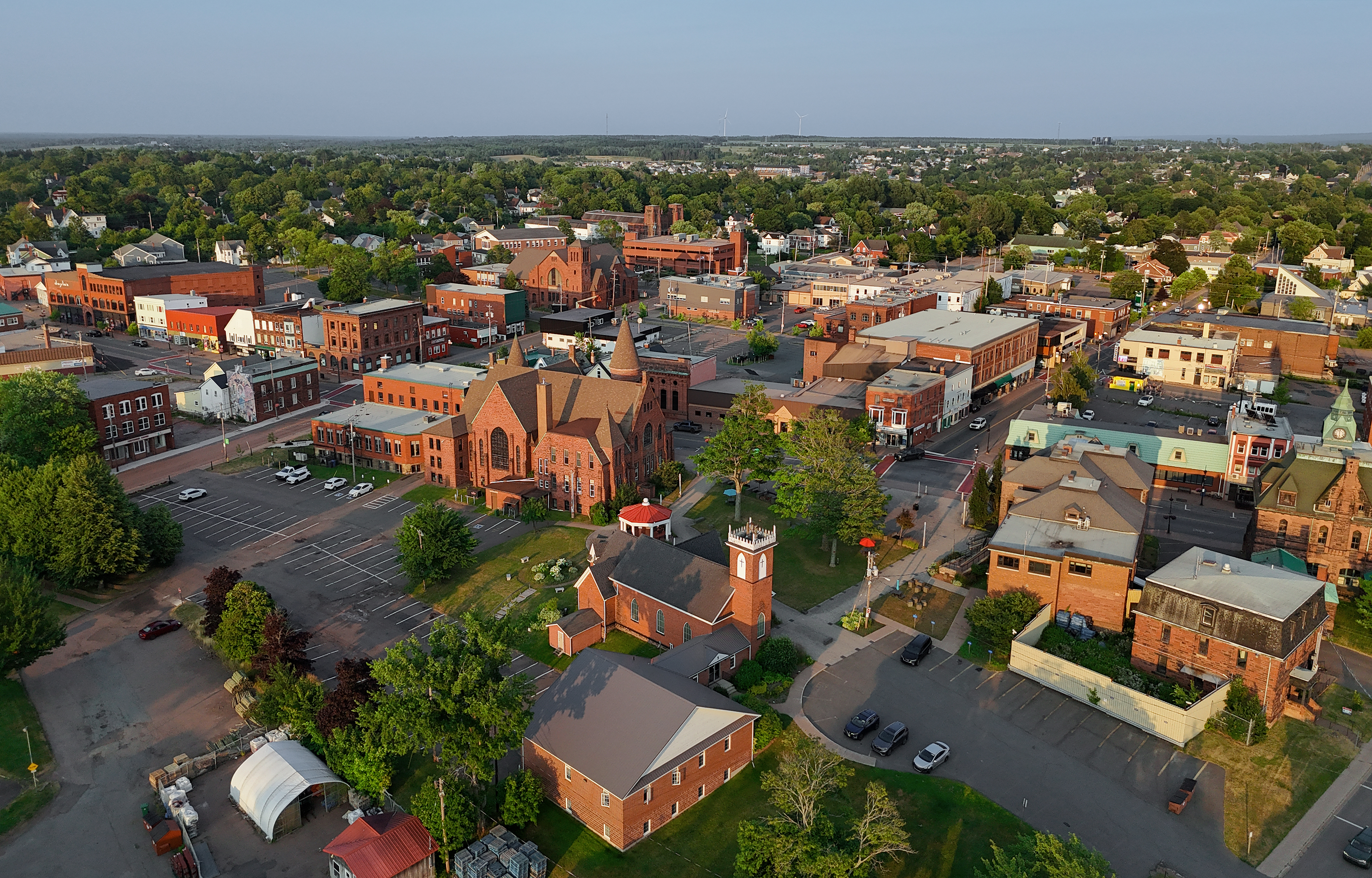
- Downtown Amherst in the evening

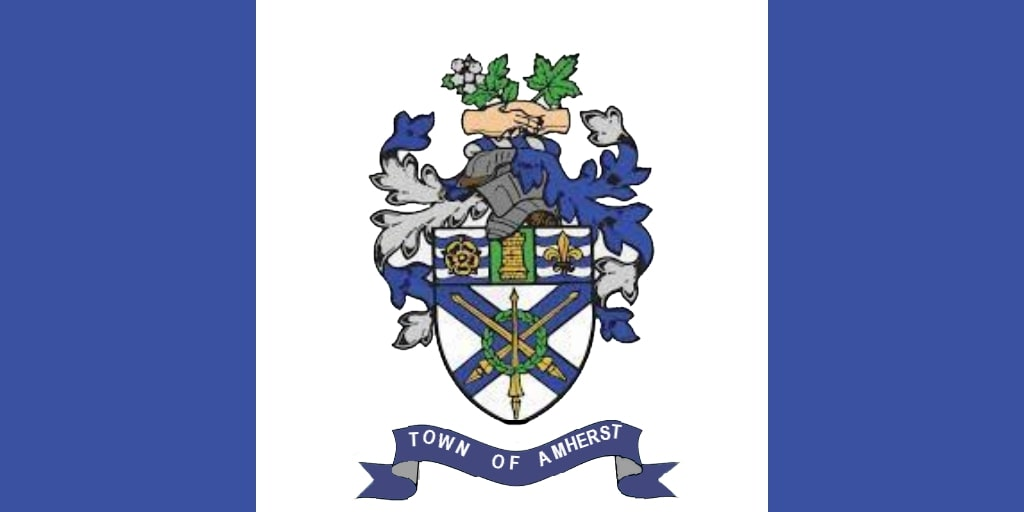
- Flag Coat of arms

- Location of Amherst, Nova Scotia Amherst, Nova Scotia (Canada)
- Coordinates: 45°50′00″N 64°12′47″W
- Country: Canada
- Province: Nova Scotia
- County: Cumberland
- Founded: 1764
- Incorporated: December 18, 1889
- Named for: Jeffery Amherst, 1st Baron Amherst

Government
  - Mayor: Rob Small
  - Deputy Mayor: TBD
  - Councillors: List of Members: Hal Davidson; Nic Furlong; Dwayne Ripley; Kathy Wells; Terry McManaman; Charlie Chambers
  - MLA: Elizabeth Smith-McCrossin Independent
  - MP: Alana Hirtle Liberal Party of Canada

Area (2021)
  - Land: 12.07 km^{2} (4.66 sq mi)
  - Urban: 12.38 km^{2} (4.78 sq mi)
- Elevation: 22.11 m (72.5 ft)

Population (2021)
  - Town: 9,404
  - Density: 779.4/km^{2} (2,019/sq mi)
  - Urban: 9,548
  - Urban density: 771.2/km^{2} (1,998/sq mi)
  - Change 2016-21: ▼−0.1%
  - Census Ranking: 452 of 5,162
- Demonym: Amherstonian
- Time zone: UTC−04:00 (AST)
  - Summer (DST): UTC−03:00 (ADT)
- Postal code(s): B4H
- Area codes: 902: Telephone Exchanges; 297, 660-1, 664, 667, 669; 694, 699
- Access Routes Hwy 104 (TCH): Trunk 2 Trunk 6 Route 204
- Dwellings: 4,799
- Median Income*: $55,600 CAD
- NTS Map: 21H16 Amherst
- GNBC Code: CAAOO
- Website: www.amherst.ca
- Median household income, 2020 (all households)

Amherst (/ˈæmɜːrst/ AM-urst) is a town in northwestern Nova Scotia, Canada, located at the northeast end of the Cumberland Basin, an arm of the Bay of Fundy, and 22 km (14 mi) south of the Northumberland Strait. The town sits on a height of land at the eastern boundary of the Isthmus of Chignecto and Tantramar Marshes, 3 km (1.9 mi) east of the interprovincial border with New Brunswick and 65 km (40 mi) southeast of the city of Moncton. It is 60 km (37 mi) southwest of the New Brunswick abutment of the Confederation Bridge to Prince Edward Island at Cape Jourimain.

== History ==
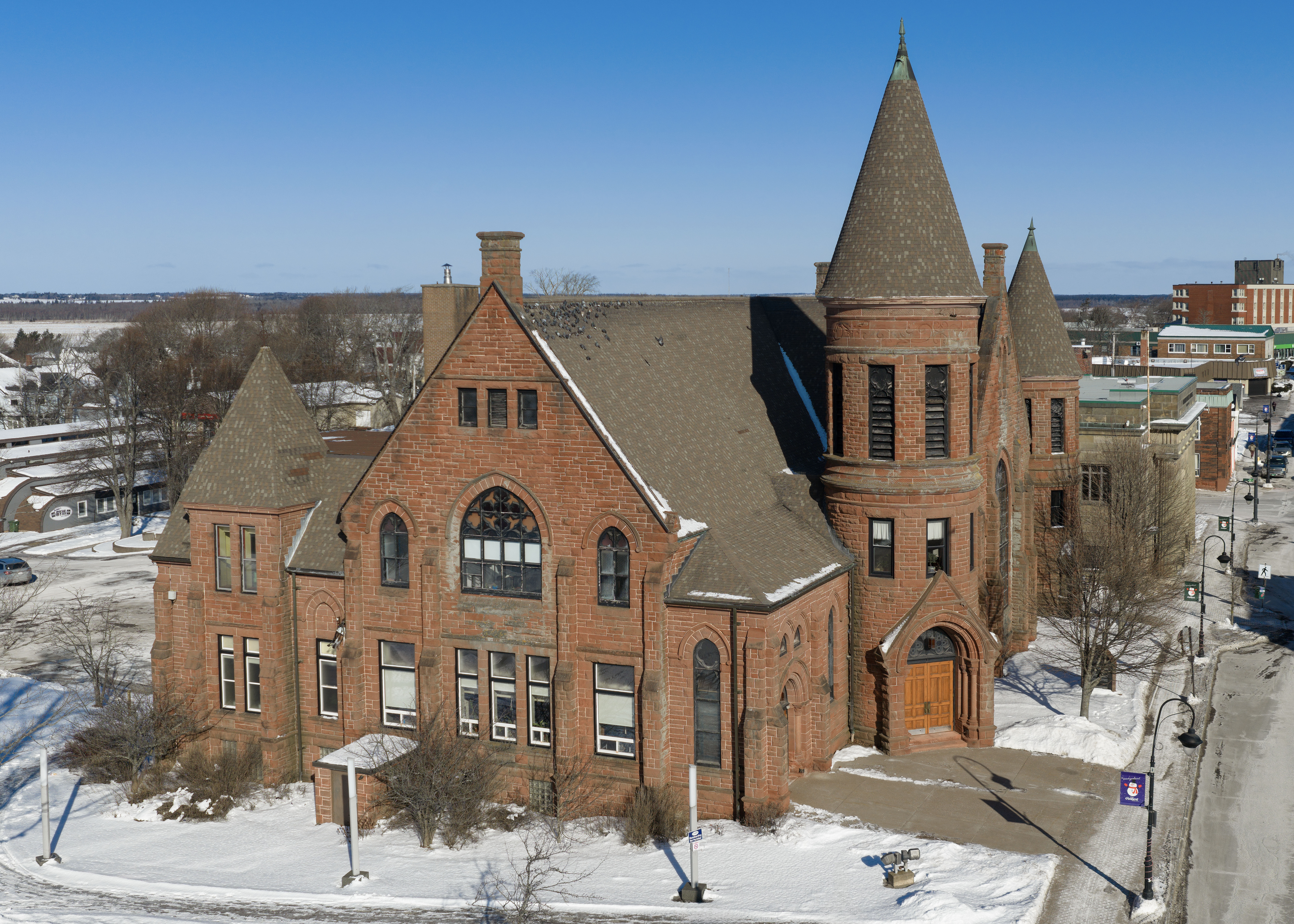
The First Baptist Church is one of many stone structures on Amherst's main street.

According to Dr. Graham P. Hennessey, "The Micmac name was Nemcheboogwek meaning 'going up rising ground', in reference to the higher land to the east of the Tantramar Marshes. The Acadians who settled here as early as 1672 called the village Les Planches. The village was later renamed Amherst by Colonel Joseph Morse in honour of Lord Amherst, the commander-in-chief of the British Army in North America during the Seven Years' War."

The town was first settled in 1764 by immigrants from Yorkshire following the expulsion of the Acadians, with the original settlement being located 3 kilometres (1.9 mi) southwest of the present town on the shore of the Bay of Fundy. These settlers were joined by United Empire Loyalists (Loyalists who fled the American colonies during the American Revolution). A mill was built on the current townsite, and the residents moved there to be closer to work.

During the 19th century, Amherst became an important regional centre for shipbuilding and other services to outlying communities. An indication of the town's importance in Canadian history is seen with its four Fathers of Confederation: Edward B. Chandler, Robert B. Dickey, Jonathan McCully, and Sir Charles Tupper.

During the late 19th century, local industrialists and entrepreneurs constructed many fine Victorian and Edwardian homes along Victoria Street East, leading toward the farming hamlet of East Amherst. Many notable residents have lived in this district, including Sir Charles Tupper and Senator Thomas R. Black.

Amherst gained brief notoriety in the late 19th century as the location of alleged poltergeist phenomena afflicting Amherst resident Esther Cox in 1878 and 1879, which became known as the Great Amherst Mystery after the publication of a popular book on the affair.

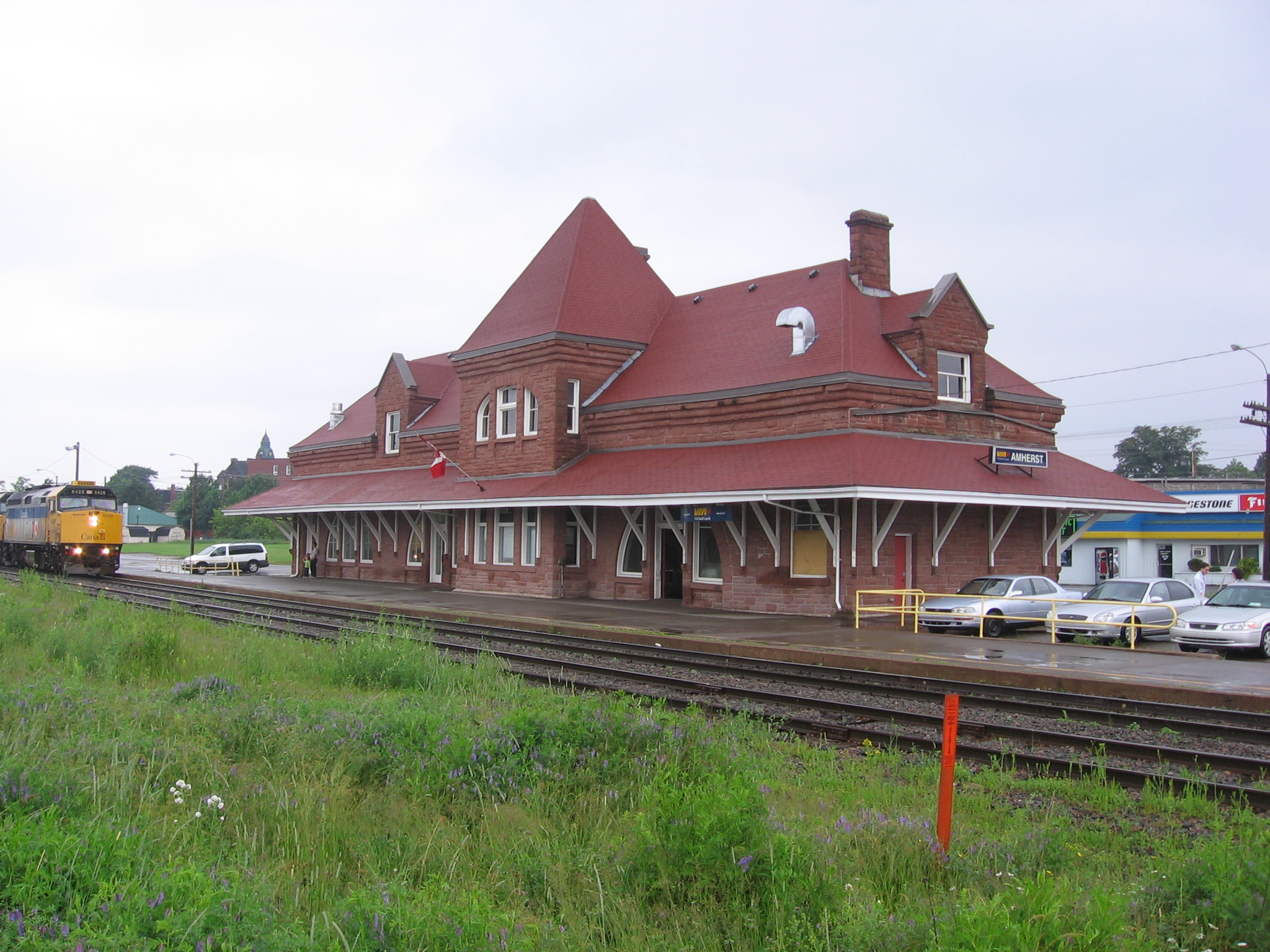
Amherst railway station

Amherst experienced unprecedented industrialization in the late 1870s after the Intercolonial Railway of Canada constructed its main line from Halifax to Quebec through the town in 1872. The location of the railway line away from the Bay of Fundy coast further consolidated the town at its present location as industry and commercial activity centred around this important transportation link. The economic boom created by the arrival of the Intercolonial Railway lasted through World War I and numerous foundries, factories and mills opened, giving rise to the nickname "Busy Amherst".

In 1908, the manufacturing output of Amherst's industries was not exceeded by any centre in the Maritime Provinces. Many of the fine old buildings along Victoria Street are considered industrial artifacts because they were constructed during a period of tremendous industry growth. Local contractors employed local craftsmen, who used local materials. Notice the emphasis on sandstone and brick, both locally produced and delightful detail which reflects the skilled craftsmanship prevalent in the 19th century.

Amherst's prosperity did not last, as the failed economic policies of the federal and provincial governments, coupled with World War I, saw the town's industrial economy begin a slow decline during the 1910s. The Amherst Internment Camp for prisoners of war and enemy aliens was set up at Malleable Iron Foundry in Amherst from April 1915 to September 1919, and Russian revolutionary Leon Trotsky was incarcerated there for one month after he was arrested in Halifax, Nova Scotia in April 1917.

During the Amherst general strike in 1919, worker unrest over social and economic conditions led to mass protests in sympathy with the Winnipeg general strike.

The eventual closure of companies such as Robb Engineering & Manufacturing (purchased by Canada Car and Foundry and then closed) and Amherst Pianos, among others, resulted in the town being overtaken by other newer manufacturing centres in central Canada during the 20th century. Amherst had a modest-sized industrial park constructed during the 1960s when the Trans-Canada Highway was being developed. Today most of the town's major employers are located there, including Emmerson Packaging and IMP Aerospace.

During the Second World War, the Royal Canadian Navy named a Flower-class corvette HMCS Amherst.

In 2002, the Cumberland Regional Health Care Centre opened on the outskirts of the town, replacing the older Highland View Regional Hospital on Pleasant Street.

The town is currently served by Via Rail's Halifax-to-Montreal train Ocean.

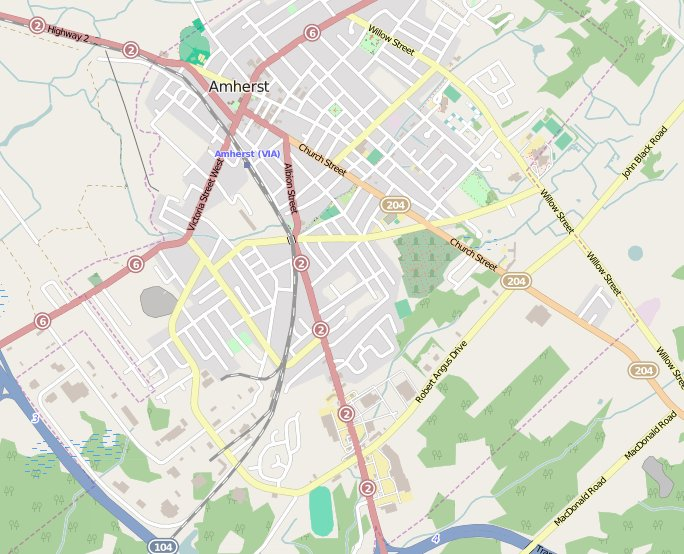
Map of Amherst

== Sports ==
Basketball was introduced to Nova Scotia at the YMCA in Amherst in 1894, by J. Howard Crocker who learned the game as a student of James Naismith, the inventor of basketball.

Amherst is home of the Amherst Ramblers, a Junior A Hockey League team from the Maritime Hockey League. All home games are played out of the 2,500 seat Amherst Stadium. The season usually runs from mid-September to early March every year. The Ramblers draw some of the largest crowds in the Maritime Hockey League, and have placed third in average attendance over the past few years. They won the Atlantic Championship in 1989 advancing to the Centennial Cup tournament in BC. They also hosted the Centennial Cup in 1993 and the Fred Page Cup in 2019.

Every August, Amherst hosts an eight-team little league baseball tournament, featuring four teams from New England.

== Climate ==
Amherst experiences a humid continental climate (Dfb). The highest temperature ever recorded was 34.4 °C (94 °F) on 18 August 1935. The coldest temperature ever recorded was −37.2 °C (−35 °F) on 18 February 1922. In 2020, Amherst (Nappan) only recorded 800.4 mm (31.51 in) of precipitation.

Climate data for Nappan, 1991−2020 normals, extremes 1890−present (Note: Climate data is recorded at Nappan, located approximately 9 km (5.6 mi) southwest of Amherst.)
Month	Jan	Feb	Mar	Apr	May	Jun	Jul	Aug	Sep	Oct	Nov	Dec	Year
Record high °C (°F)	18.0 (64.4)	16.2 (61.2)	24.2 (75.6)	26.1 (79.0)	30.0 (86.0)	31.7 (89.1)	32.7 (90.9)	34.4 (93.9)	32.2 (90.0)	27.0 (80.6)	23.5 (74.3)	18.5 (65.3)	34.4 (93.9)
Mean daily maximum °C (°F)	−2.0 (28.4)	−1.4 (29.5)	2.6 (36.7)	9.1 (48.4)	15.8 (60.4)	20.7 (69.3)	24.3 (75.7)	24.1 (75.4)	20.0 (68.0)	13.7 (56.7)	7.4 (45.3)	1.6 (34.9)	11.3 (52.3)
Daily mean °C (°F)	−6.9 (19.6)	−6.3 (20.7)	−2.0 (28.4)	4.1 (39.4)	10.1 (50.2)	15.1 (59.2)	18.8 (65.8)	18.5 (65.3)	14.6 (58.3)	8.9 (48.0)	3.3 (37.9)	−2.5 (27.5)	6.3 (43.3)
Mean daily minimum °C (°F)	−11.7 (10.9)	−11.2 (11.8)	−6.7 (19.9)	−0.8 (30.6)	4.4 (39.9)	9.4 (48.9)	13.3 (55.9)	12.9 (55.2)	9.1 (48.4)	3.9 (39.0)	−0.8 (30.6)	−6.6 (20.1)	1.3 (34.3)
Record low °C (°F)	−36.7 (−34.1)	−37.2 (−35.0)	−29.5 (−21.1)	−21.1 (−6.0)	−6.7 (19.9)	−3.3 (26.1)	−1.1 (30.0)	0.0 (32.0)	−4.5 (23.9)	−12.2 (10.0)	−18.9 (−2.0)	−34.0 (−29.2)	−37.2 (−35.0)
Average precipitation mm (inches)	101.8 (4.01)	79.7 (3.14)	91.2 (3.59)	93.3 (3.67)	83.8 (3.30)	96.3 (3.79)	80.5 (3.17)	82.7 (3.26)	108.9 (4.29)	115.3 (4.54)	114.4 (4.50)	113.5 (4.47)	1,161.2 (45.72)
Average rainfall mm (inches)	47.9 (1.89)	36.1 (1.42)	49.1 (1.93)	62.7 (2.47)	91.7 (3.61)	79.6 (3.13)	89.0 (3.50)	74.4 (2.93)	98.4 (3.87)	97.2 (3.83)	95.9 (3.78)	64.2 (2.53)	886.0 (34.88)
Average snowfall cm (inches)	62.4 (24.6)	51.2 (20.2)	49.9 (19.6)	23.9 (9.4)	5.2 (2.0)	0.0 (0.0)	0.0 (0.0)	0.0 (0.0)	0.0 (0.0)	0.2 (0.1)	15.6 (6.1)	45.8 (18.0)	254.2 (100.1)
Average precipitation days (≥ 0.2 mm)	17.7	15.4	16.1	15.4	16.7	16.7	14.9	13.5	13.6	16.5	17.1	16.9	190.5
Average rainy days (≥ 0.2 mm)	5.3	4.9	6.9	10.0	13.8	13.6	12.7	12.1	11.4	12.8	12.3	6.9	122.6
Average snowy days (≥ 0.2 cm)	10.4	8.4	7.3	3.6	0.52	0.0	0.0	0.0	0.0	0.09	2.8	7.6	40.7
Mean monthly sunshine hours	93.9	108.6	137.9	146.5	186.0	208.5	229.7	218.0	161.1	130.7	76.2	79.3	1,776.1
Percentage possible sunshine	33.1	37.2	37.4	36.2	40.2	44.4	48.4	49.8	42.7	38.4	26.7	29.3	38.6
Source: Environment Canada (rain, snow, sun 1981−2010)

== Demographics ==
Historical populations
Year	Pop.	±%
1871	1,839	—
1881	2,274	+23.7%
1891	3,781	+66.3%
1901	4,964	+31.3%
1911	8,973	+80.8%
1921	9,998	+11.4%
1931	7,450	−25.5%
1941	8,620	+15.7%
1951	9,870	+14.5%
1956	10,301	+4.4%
1961	10,788	+4.7%
1971	9,966	−7.6%
1981	9,684	−2.8%
1986	9,671	−0.1%
1991	9,742	+0.7%
1996	9,669	−0.7%
2001	9,470	−2.1%
2006	9,505	+0.4%
2011	9,717	+2.2%
2016	9,413	−3.1%
2021	9,404	−0.1%

In the 2021 Census of Population conducted by Statistics Canada, Amherst had a population of 9,404 living in 4,480 of its 4,799 total private dwellings, a change of −0.1% from its 2016 population of 9,413. With a land area of 12.07 km^{2} (4.66 sq mi), it had a population density of 779.1/km^{2} (2,017.9/sq mi) in 2021.

Canada 2006 Census
Ethnic Origin	Population	% of Total Population
Canadian	4,215	45.4
English	3,625	39.1
Scottish	2,745	29.6
Irish	2,040	22.0
French	1,840	19.8
German	655	7.1
Dutch (Netherlands)	385	4.1

In the period between 1996 and 2006, Amherst lost over half of its Black population. The African Nova Scotian community has lived in the area since 1783, largely settled around the south end of the town in an area called Sand Hill.

== Media ==
=== Television ===
Amherst is served locally by EastLink TV. The station also serves the communities of Springhill, Oxford, and others in the county, as well as Sackville, New Brunswick.

=== Radio ===
- 90.1 FM CFNS
- 99.1 FM CITA
- 101.7 FM CKDH
- 107.9 FM CFTA (Tantramar FM)

=== Newspapers ===
- Amherst News (weekly)

== Arms ==
Coat of arms of Amherst, Nova Scotia
Notes Recorded at the College of Arms on 20 June 1962. Crest Two hands clasped couped holding a sprig of mayflower Proper and a maple leaf Vert. Escutcheon Argent a saltire Azure surmounted by three tilting lances in asterisk Or interlaced by a laurel wreath Proper on a chief barry wavy Argent and Azure between a rose and a fleur-de-lis Or a pale Vert charged with a tower Or.

== See also ==
- Amherst Armoury
- List of municipalities in Nova Scotia
