= A Red, Red Rose =

1794 poem and song by Robert Burns

- Song by Peter (Pietro) Urbani (1797); Niel Gow (1799); Traditional (1821)
- Other name: My Love Is Like a Red, Red Rose
- Text: Robert Burns
- Language: Scots

"A Red, Red Rose" (MIDI realization of the 1821 version based on "Low Down in the Broom")

"A Red, Red Rose" is a 1794 song in Scots by Robert Burns based on traditional sources. The song is also referred to by the title "(Oh) My Love is Like a Red, Red Rose" and is often published as a poem. Many composers have set Burns' lyric to music, but it gained worldwide popularity set to the traditional tune "Low Down in the Broom"

It has a Roud Folk Song Index number of 12946.

== Text ==
1. My luve's like a red, red rose,
That's newly sprung in June:
O my luve's like the melodie
That's sweetly play'd in tune.

2. As fair art thou, my bonnie lass,
So deep in luve am I:
And I will luve thee still, my dear,
Till a'the seas gang dry.

3. Till a'the seas gang dry, my dear,
And the rocks melt wi' the sun:
I will luve thee still, my dear,
While the sands o' life shall run.

4. And fare thee weel, my only luve,
And fare thee weel a while!
And I will come again, my luve,
Tho' it were ten thousand mile.

== Background ==
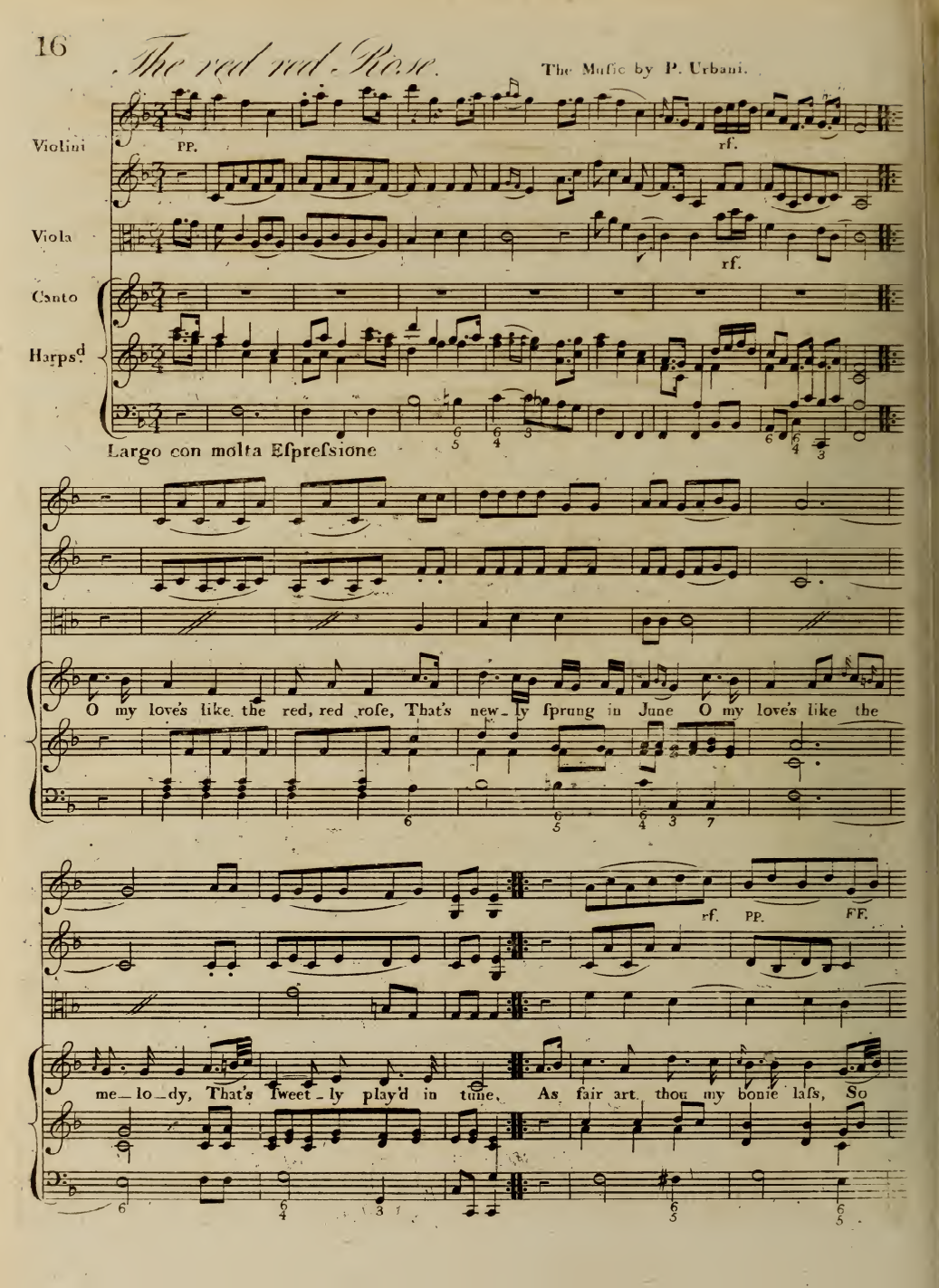
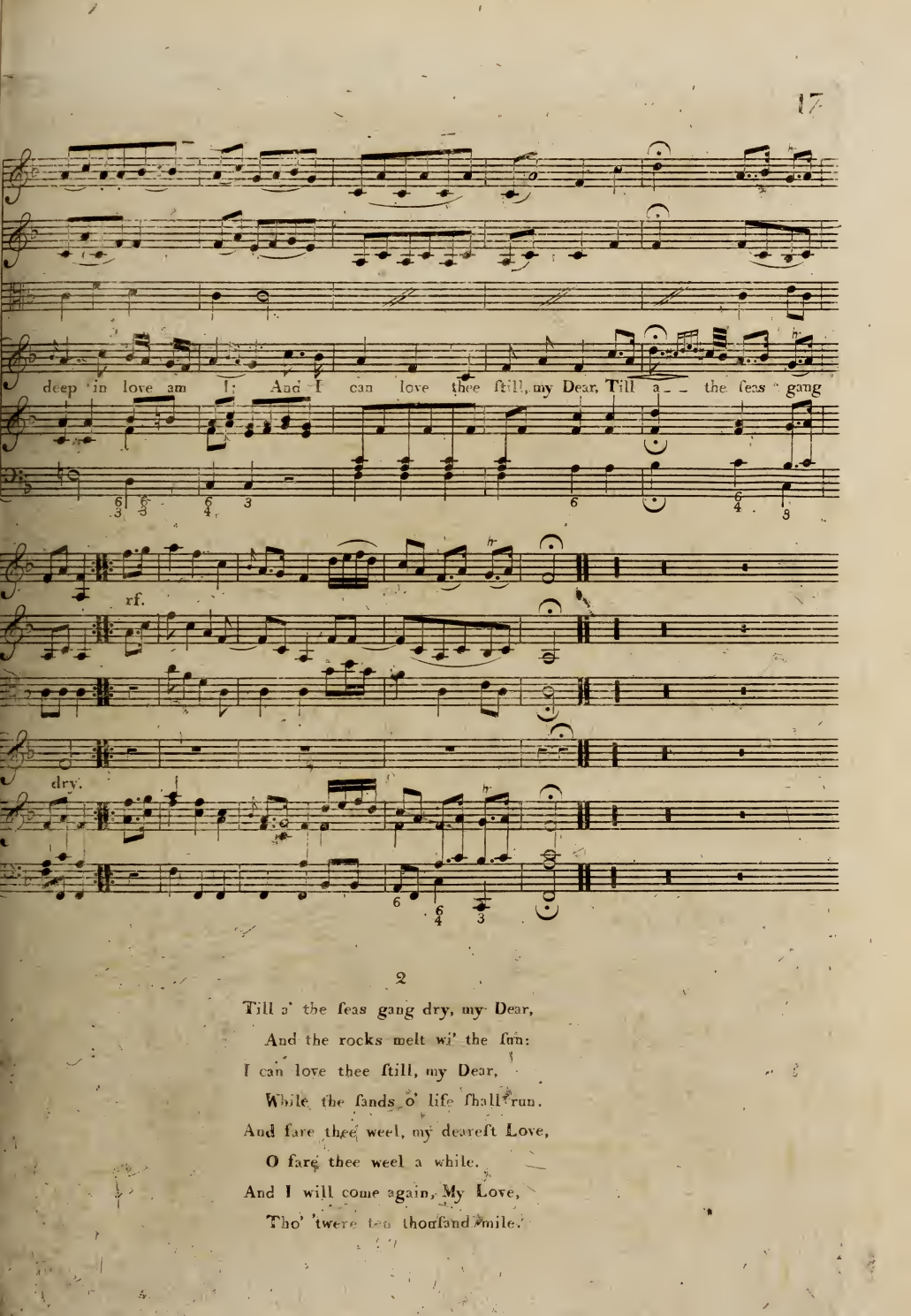
Publication in A Selection of Scots Songs Harmonized Improved with Simple and Adapted Graces by Peter Urbani, Edinburgh, c. 1793

In the final years of his short life, Burns worked extensively on traditional Scottish songs, ensuring the preservation of over 300 songs, including "Auld Lang Syne". He collaborated with James Johnson on a folk music collection called the Scots Musical Museum (published in six volumes between 1787-1803). Burns also contributed to George Thomson's five-volume A Select Collection of Original Scottish Airs for the Voice (1793–1841).

Burns intended "A Red, Red Rose" to be published in Thomson's collection. In 1794, he wrote to Alexander Cunningham that he and Thomson disagreed on the song's merits, "What to me appears to be the simple and the wild, to him, and I suspect to you likewise, will be looked on as the ludicrous and the absurd."

At the time, Thomson's publishing project was rivaled by the Italian musician Pietro Urbani who called his anthology A Selection of Scots Songs. Burns and Urbani spent three days together in 1793, collaborating on various songs. Burns recalls, "I likewise gave (Urbani) a simple old Scots song which I had pickt up in this country, which he had promised to set in a suitable manner. I would not even have given him this, had there been any of Mr Thomson's airs, suitable to it, unoccupied." Urbani began to boast of a partnership with Burns on the Scots Songs anthology. Burns called this a "damned falsehood", and ended their friendship.

Nevertheless, Urbani was the first to press with "A Red, Red Rose" in 1794, publishing it in the second book of his anthology. In his book, Urbani coyly refers to Burns without naming him, "the words of the RED, RED ROSE were obligingly given to him by a celebrated Scots poet, who was so struck by them when sung by a country girl that he wrote them down and, not being pleased with the air, begged the author to set them to music in the style of a Scots tune, which he has done accordingly."

== Sources ==
Burns is best understood as a compiler or a redactor of "A Red, Red Rose" rather than its author. F.B. Snyder wrote that Burns could take "childish, inept" sources and turn them into magic, "The electric magnet is not more unerring in selecting iron from a pile of trash than was Burns in culling the inevitable phrase or haunting cadence from the thousands of mediocre possibilities."

One source that is often cited for the song is a Lieutenant Hinches' farewell to his sweetheart, which Ernest Rhys asserts is the source for the central metaphor and some of its best lines. Hinches' poem, "O fare thee well, my dearest dear", bears a striking similarity to Burns's verse, notably the lines that refer to "ten thousand miles" and "Till a' the seas gang dry, my dear".

A ballad originating from the same period entitled "The Turtle Dove" also contains similar lines, such as "Though I go ten thousand mile, my dear" and "Oh, the stars will never fall down from the sky/Nor the rocks never melt with the sun". Of particular note is a collection of verse dating from around 1770, The Horn Fair Garland, which Burns inscribed, "Robine Burns aught this buik and no other". A poem in this collection, "The loyal Lover's faithful promise to his Sweet-heart on his going on a long journey" also contains similar verses such as "Althou' I go a thousand miles" and "The day shall turn to night, dear love/And the rocks melt in the sun".

An even earlier source is the broadside ballad "The Wanton Wife of Castle-Gate: Or, The Boat-mans Delight", which dates to the 1690s. Midway through the ballad, Burns' first stanza can be found almost verbatim: "Her Cheeks are like the Roses, that blossoms fresh in June; O shes like some new-strung Instrument thats newly put in tune." The provenance for such a song is likely medieval.

== Music ==
=== Urbani ===
Pietro Urbani was the first composer to score Burns' poem in 1794. Like most of the pieces in Scots Songs, it is orchestrated for a small chamber ensemble of 2 violins, viola, and harpsichord. Unlike most other settings of the poem, Urbani puts it in 3/4, which creates certain metrical problems that results in missplaced stresses. At one point, Urbani even has to add a word to fit his chosen meter. Though his is the original setting of "Red, Red Rose", it is little known and rarely performed.

=== Gow ===
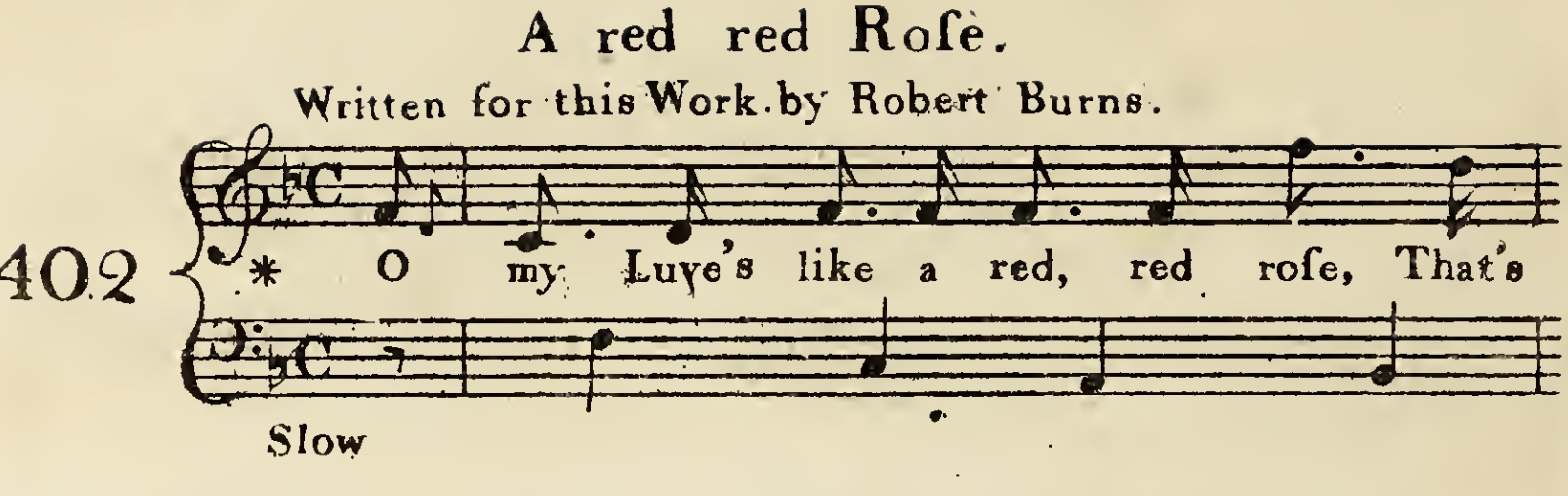
Incipit of "A Red Red Rose" set to the tune of "Major Graham", Johnson's The Scots Musical Museum, vol. V

Burns specified the melody that he had in mind for "Red, Red Rose" in a letter to James Johnson, "The tune of this song is in Niel Gow's first Collection & is called there 'Major Graham' – it is to be found page 6th of that Collection." Niel Gow's A collection of Strathspey Reels appeared in 1784. He later published two more collections. "Major Graham" is so similar to an earlier song called "Miss Admiral Gordon's Strathspey" that one writer referred to Gow's tune as a "palpable plagiarism".

Johnson dutifully set "A Red, Red Rose" to Gow's "Major Gordon" as per Burns' instructions and published it as song number 402 in the fifth volume of Scots Musical Museum in 1797. This tune bears striking similarities to the eventual melody which would make the song famous, and "Major Gordon" is often mislabeled as the source. Johnson also included an "Old Set" version of "Red, Red Rose" as song number 403. It has been suggested that it is the "Old Set" version which contains the actual melody Burns heard sung in the country.

Johnson's setting of "A Red, Red Rose" has been recorded by Jean Redpath.

=== Marshall ===
George Thomson finally did get around to publishing "A Red, Red Rose" as song number 89 in the fourth volume of his Original Scottish Airs, which appeared in 1799. Thomson attributes the melody to William Marshall, calling it "Whishaw's Favorite". Marshall's tune is actually called "Mrs. Hamilton of Wishaw's Strathspey", and it was published in the composer's Early Scottish Melodies. Thomson's choice yielded similarly clumsy results as Urbani's, requiring alterations and additions to Burns' text to fit Marshall's melody.

=== Traditional ===
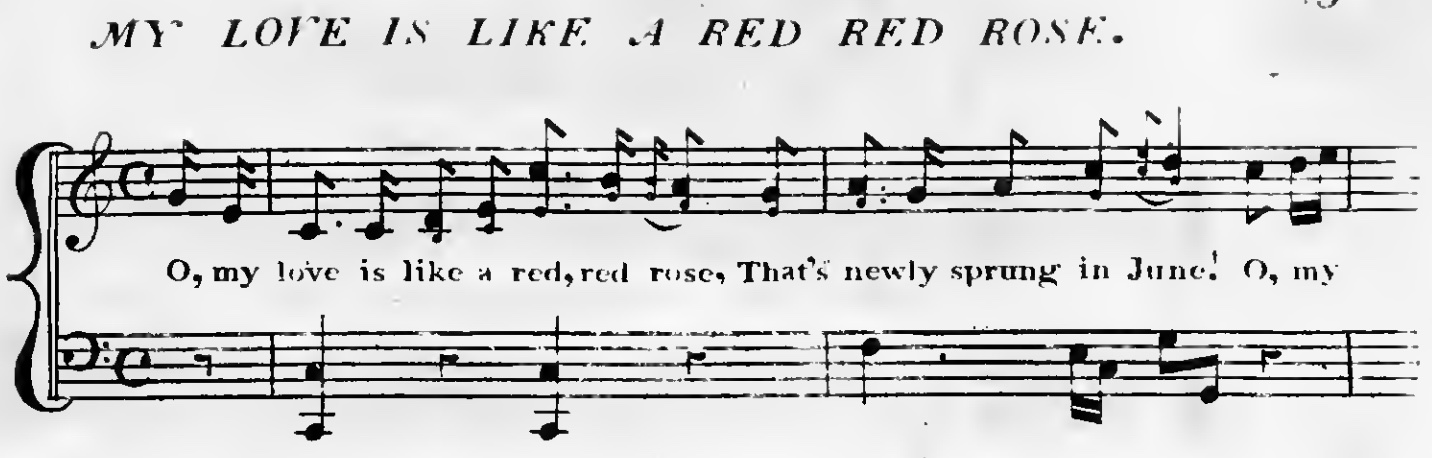
Opening of "My Love is Like a Red, Red Rose" paired with "Low Down in the Broom" as it appears in Smith's The Scotish Minstrel, vol. 3

The version of "A Red, Red Rose" that is popularly known all over the world uses the tune of a traditional song called "Low Down in the Broom". The melody was widely anthologized, and Burns was familiar with it. In fact, he wrote to George Thomson in 1793, "Low down in the broom—In my opinion, deserves more properly a place among your lively and humorous Songs."

Burns' lyric was not paired with "Low Down in the Broom" until Robert Archibald Smith published the third volume of his Scotish Minstrel in 1821. Prior to this pairing, "A Red, Red Rose" was not widely published as sheet music.

"Low Down in the Broom" has several similarities to "Major Graham", which has given rise to the mistaken attribution to Gow as the composer of the song. Both begin with the same melodic contour, but Gow's tune is much more syncopated and harder to sing. "Major Graham" gives stress to the wrong syllables in Burns' text so much that the entire focus of the song shifts to the narrator away from his love.

=== Other settings ===
Robert Schumann set Burns' poem in German as "Dem roten Röslein gleicht mein Lieb" for piano and voice in 1840. It is the second song in his Fünf Lieder und Gesänge, Op. 27. Burns was a frequent source for Schumann's vocal compositions.

Amy Beach created a version for piano and voice in 1889, "My luve is like a red, red rose". It is Op. 12, no. 3 of her work.

Jimmy Van Heusen composed a version of "My Love is Like a Red, Red Rose". Pat Boone sings Van Heusen's work in the 1959 film adaptation of Journey to the Center of the Earth.

Carly Simon sings a setting of "A Red, Red Rose" composed by her sister Lucy Simon on the 1969 album The Simon Sisters Sing the Lobster Quadrille and Other Songs for Children.

Camera Obscura wrote their own version of the song and included it as a B-side for their 2005 single "I Love My Jean". Burns' lyrics are included in the song "Final Breath" by the post rock band Pelican on their album What We All Come to Need.

The Mediæval Bæbes have recorded their version under the title "Till A' the Seas Gang Dry" on their 2008 album Illumination.

== Legacy ==
A Swedish version of the poem, "Min älskling (du är som en ros)", was made famous by Evert Taube in his 1943 book Ballads in Bohuslän. A free Chinese translation was made by Su Manshu.

In an ad campaign for HMV, Bob Dylan said "A Red, Red Rose" was an inspiration for his creative life.
