= A Man's a Man for A' That =

1795 song by Robert Burns

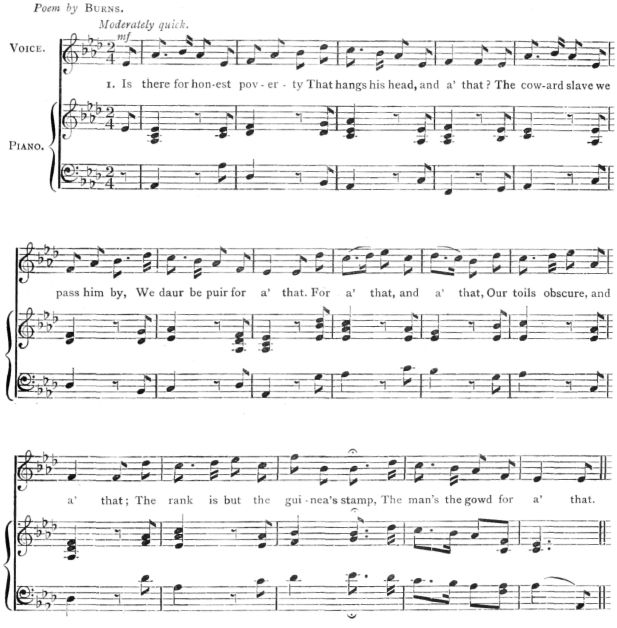

Song
- Songwriter: Robert Burns

"A Man's a Man for A' That" is a song by Scottish poet Robert Burns, famous for its expression of egalitarianism.

The song made its first appearance in a letter Burns wrote to George Thomson in January 1795. It was subsequently published anonymously in the August edition of the Glasgow Magazine, a radical monthly. Thomson later included it in the fourth volume of his Select Collection of Original Scottish Airs, giving it the title "The Honest Man the Best of Men".

Scottish folksinger Sheena Wellington sang the song at the opening of the Scottish Parliament in May 1999. Midge Ure did the same in July 2016. The song was also sung at the funeral of Donald Dewar, the inaugural First Minister of Scotland. "Trotz alledem", a German translation of the song written by Ferdinand Freiligrath, was widely used during the Revolutions of 1848.

The words "pride o' worth" appear on the crest of the Scottish Qualifications Authority.

== Poem ==
Is there, for honest poverty,
That hangs his head, and a' that?
The coward slave, we pass him by,
We dare be poor for a' that!
For a' that, and a' that,
Our toils obscure and a' that,
The rank is but the guinea's stamp,
The man's the gowd for a' that.

What though on hamely fare we dine,
Wear hoddin grey, and a' that;
Gie fools their silks, and knaves their wine,
A man's a man for a' that:
For a' that, and a' that,
Their tinsel shew, and a' that,
The honest man, tho' e'er sae poor,
Is king o' men for a' that.

Ye see yon birkie, (Note: A young man, especially a conceited one.) ca'd a lord,
Wha struts and stares and a' that;
Tho' hundreds worship at his word,
He's but a coof (Note: A fool, a ninny.) for a' that:
For a' that, and a' that,
His ribband, star, and a' that,
The man o' independent mind,
He looks and laughs at a' that.

A prince can make a belted knight,
A marquis, duke, and a' that;
But an honest man's aboon his might, (Note: Beyond his power.)
Gude faith, he maunna fa' that! (Note: He cannot lay claim to that.)
For a' that, and a' that,
Their dignities and a' that;
The pith o' sense, and pride o' worth,
Are higher rank than a' that.

Then let us pray that come it may,
As come it will, for a' that,
That sense and worth, o'er a' the earth,
May bear the gree, (Note: Have the victory.) and a' that!
For a' that, and a' that,
It's coming yet for a' that,
That man to man, the warld o'er,
Shall brothers be for a' that.

== Recordings ==
- Earl Robinson covered it on his 1963 album Earl Robinson Sings
- The Corries played it on Scotland Will Flourish, their 1985 live album
- The McCalmans played it on their 1993 album "Honest Poverty" -an album title also drawn from the song.
- The Old Blind Dogs covered this song on their 2001 album Fit?
- Paolo Nutini covered this song for BBC Scotland at the Barrowland Ballroom, Glasgow, in 2007
- Marc Gunn covered it on his 2013 album Scottish Songs of Drinking & Rebellion
- The Mudmen covered it on their 2012 album Donegal Danny
- Dougie MacLean covered it on his 1995 album Tribute
- Andy M. Stewart covered it on his 1991 album "The Songs of Robert Burns" as "Is There for Honest Poverty"

== See also ==
- Scottish national identity
- Scottish republicanism
