= The Sailor's Departure From His Dearest Love =

Song

The Sailor's Departure From His Dearest Love is an English broadside ballad from the 17th century, about a sailor and his lover saying goodbye just as the sailor's ship leaves. Sung to the tune of Adieu My Pretty One. Copies of the broadside can be found at the British Library, the University of Glasgow Library, the National Library of Scotland, and Magdalene College, Cambridge.

== Synopsis ==
The ballad is told first from the man's perspective, and then from the woman's. In the first part, the sailor explains to his lover that he must leave for the seas, and that sailors must endure the dangers of the waters, but he will remain true to her. He asks her to pray for him and to keep loving him. He tells her that he will love her forever, and that mountains would crumble and fire freeze before his love for her changed. He finally calls on every person in England to witness his love. She replies that she will cry and mourn for him, but she will remain true and will pray for him until he returns. In the final stanza, they each say goodbye to each other and he sails away.

== Cultural and historical significance ==
Charles Harding Firth reads the ballad within the larger context of naval songs that became popular on shore first, but were then adopted by sailors as songs of the sea. He argues that ballads like this prove an increasing interest in the navy in the 17th century.

The ballad, along with another ballad, The Unkind Parents, has thematic similarities with Robert Burns's A Red, Red Rose, and Henley and Henderson have used evidence from Burns' library to show that he was familiar with these broadsides through chapbooks and collections of songs. They argue that the similarities are intentionally drawn from the ballads.
