= John Syme (lawyer) =

Scottish lawyer & friend of Robert Burns (1755–1831)

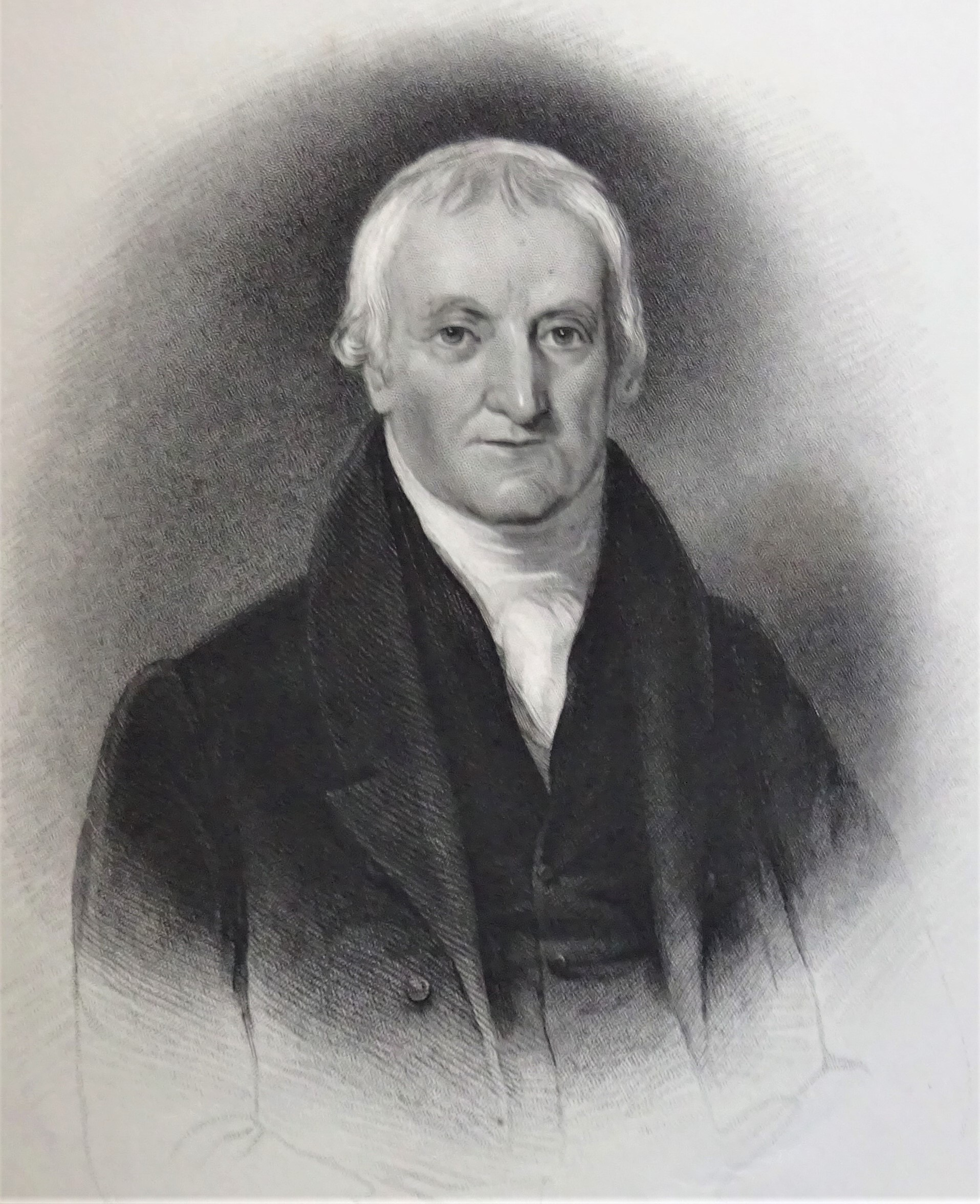
- John Syme
- Born: 1755; Barncailzie
- Died: 24 November 1831; Dumfries
- Occupation: Lawyer / Writer to the Signet

John Syme (1755 – 24 November 1831) was a Scottish lawyer and one of the poet Robert Burns's closest friends during his time in Dumfries. In the summers of 1793 and 1794 he joined Burns on his two short tours of Galloway. Syme and Alexander Cunningham were amongst the most active of the friends and admirers of Burns's works who raised funds for the poet's family and for his mausoleum with the assistance of others such as James Currie. Together with Dr Willam Maxwell he arranged Burns's funeral.

== Life and character ==
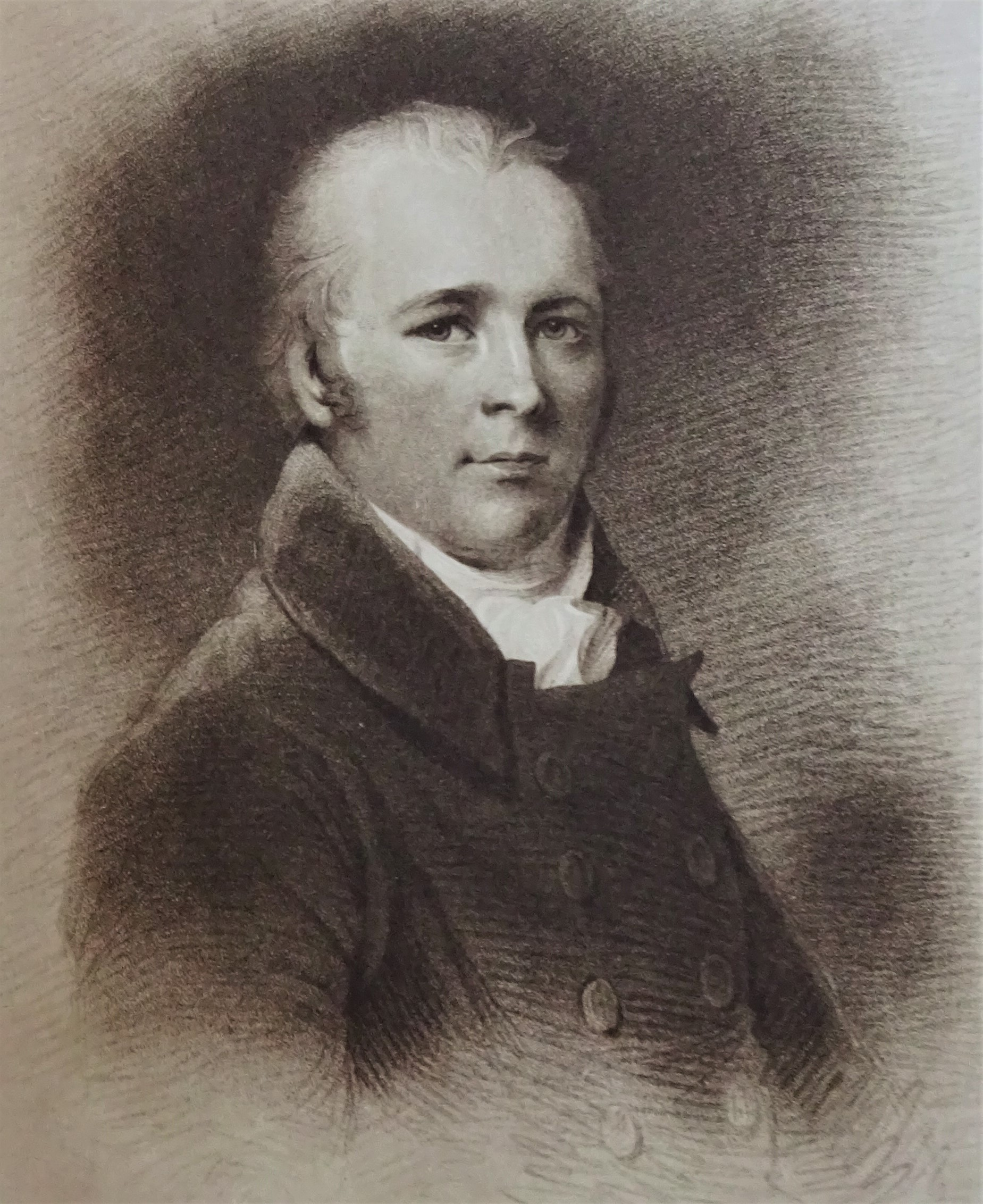
Dr James Currie, Symes friend and Burns's Biographer.

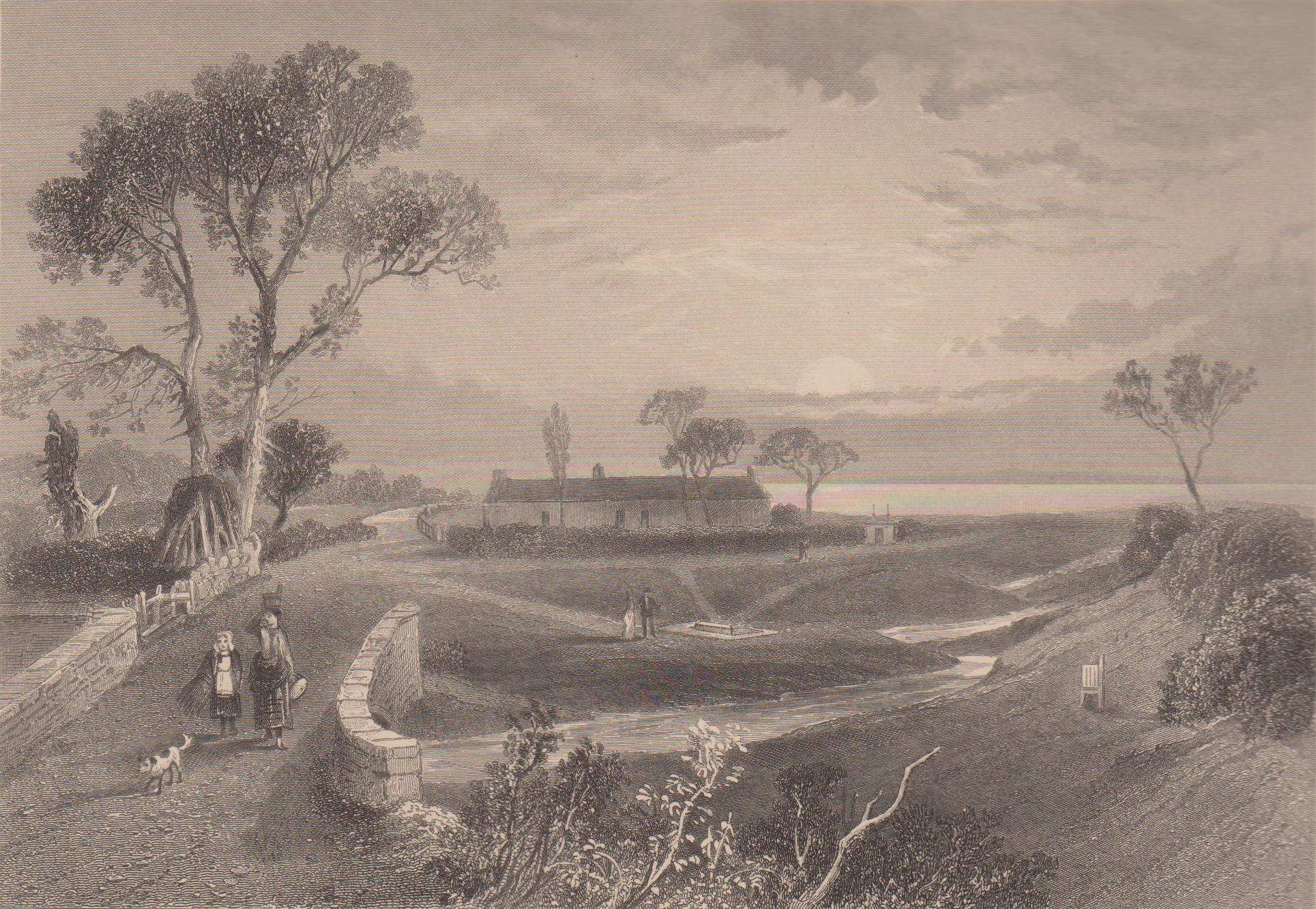
The Brow Well where Syme visited Robert Burns on 15 July 1796

He was the son of the Laird of Barncailzie in the old Kirkudbrightshire, Dumfries and Galloway. He was educated in Edinburgh and had served in the 72nd Regiment of Foot as an ensign for several years, however he left to manage his father's estate only for the family to be divested of their property to pay their debts following the collapse of the Douglas, Heron & Company Bank in Ayr Bank. He had carried out experiments in agricultural improvements at Barncailzie which lies a few miles from Crocketford. From 1791 he worked in Dumfries in an office in the Wee or Stinking Vennel, now 11 Bank Street, directly below the first house that Robert Burns and his family occupied after moving from Ellisland Farm.

Syme followed in his father's footsteps in as far as that he became a Writer to the Signet. In 1791 he was appointed His Majestie's Distributor of Stamps and Collector of Stamp Duties for the Dumfries district, collecting taxes on land sales, registrations, etc.

He and his family lived at Ryedale House, a small estate in the Parish of Troqueer on the Maxwellton side of the River Nith. Syme married Jane Millar, who died in pregnancy in 1809. Syme died on the 24 November 1831 aged 76 and was buried beside his wife in the Troqueer Kirkyard having lived 35 years longer than his friend Robert Burns.

Syme was also the factor for his old school friend, Dr James Currie's, Moncrieff Estate near Moffat in Dumfriesshire. In addition he acted at times as a surveyor for Currie; the two men served on the committee of the Dumfries and Galloway Horticultural Society and they often went on hunting expeditions together.

Syme was one of the first to join the Royal Dumfries Volunteers in January 1795, as did Robert Burns, John Lewars and James Gracie under Captain John Finnan. This Volunteer force was set up in response to fear of a French invasion.

In the History of Dumfries, William McDowall wrote in 1867 that "Mr Syme is still well remembered in the town as a fine specimen of the old Scottish gentleman, clear-headed, warm-hearted, well-cultivated, courteous, full of anecdote and wit and, as the fashion then went, devoted to the pleasures of the table, which he never relished so much as when Burns was his cronie."

== Association with Robert Burns ==
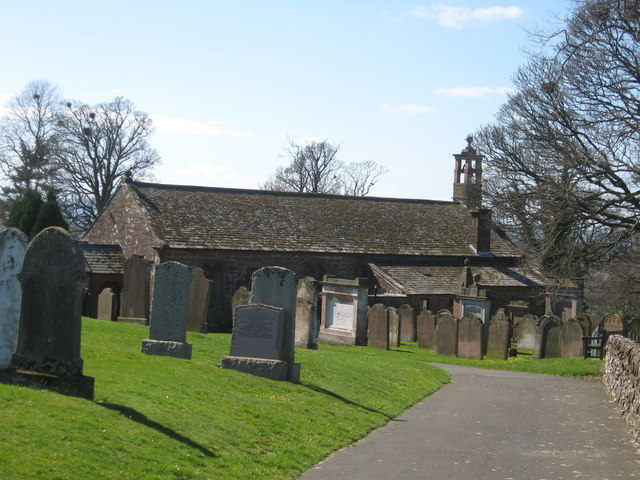
Tinwald Church. The influential John Bushby lived in the village.

Syme got to know Burns whilst the poet was living at Ellisland Farm and came into Dumfries once a week to collector his mail from the Post Office. In September 1790 he was invited to breakfast at Ellisland and met Jean Armour, however he was not very taken by her, observing "Methinks he has exhibited his poetical genius when he celebrated her." The two met socially at John Bushby's home at Tinwald. Burn's is said to have fallen out with Bushby over a prank where he pretended that a pudding was cold, however when Burns heartily 'tucked in' he bady scalded his mouth on the piping hot food. In September 1793 he wrote of Burns that "Were it not for his presence, I should feel a dreary blank in the society of this town" and in June 1793 he commented that "I see Burns frequently, and love him more and more."

Burns regarded Syme very highly, terming him his "Supreme Court of Critical Judicature, from which there is no appeal."

Burns was a frequent visitor at Syme's family home, Ryedale House, in the Parish of Troqueer. He wrote two short verses regarding Syme: Apology to John Syme.

"No more of your guests, be they titled or not,
And cookery the first in the nation:
Who is proof to thy personal converse and wit,
Is proof to all other temptation."

In May 1794 Burns sent Syme a case of a dozen bottles of porter from the Jerusalem Tavern together with the verse: To John Syme of Ryedale

"O had the malt thy strength of mind,
Or hops the flavour of thy wit,
'Twere drink for first of human kind,
A gift that e'en for Syme were fit".

He is also referred to in the Second Heron Election Ballad:

"An there'll be Stamp-Office Johnie:
'Tak tent how ye purchase a dram!"

Syme had a copy of the Della Cruscan British Album and Burns wrote the following lines within it:

"PERISH their names, however great or brave,
Who in the DESPOT's cursed errands bleed!
But who for FREEDOM fills a hero's grave,
Fame with a Seraph-pen, record the glorious deed!"

The 'despot' is an unwise reference to the prime minister William Pitt.

Syme was an enthusiastic collector of Burns's epigrams, many of which, although humorous, were somewhat unwise in that they lampooned, criticised, etc. the very people who could have assisted Burns's in his career, etc. It is clear however that Syme had not expected them all to be published. These epigrams and some poems are contained within two manuscripts in the 1930s were in the hands of E.A.Hornel, the biblophile and artist.

Burns wrote on a dinner-goblet with his diamond-point pen at Ryedale, Syme, annoyed at having his set of crystal goblets defaced, threw the goblet under the fire grate: it was taken however taken by his clerk, and preserved as a valued artefact.

"There's death in the cup sae beware!
Nay, more there is danger in touching;
But wha can avoid the fell snare?
The man and his wine's sae bewitching!"

The text was adapted by Burns from the Bible, the Second Book of Kings, iv, 40.

In March 1792 Burns wrote that:"I lately lost a valuable seal, which vexes me much. I have gotten one of your Highland pebbles, which, I fancy would make a very decent one, and I want to carve my armorial bearings upon it. Will you be so obliging as enquire what will be the expense of such a business. I do not know that my name is matriculated, as the Heralds call it, at all; but I have invented one for myself; so, you know, I will be chief of the Name; and by courtesy of Scotland, will likewise be entitled to Supporters. These, however, I do not intend having on my Seal." It was Syme who delivered the 'Highland pebble' and in his letter to George Thomson Burns reminds him that the holly is to be show as a bush and not a tree.'

Burns had received an official reprimand from the Excise for becoming involved in politics. and in January 1793 Syme suggested at Ryedale during a convivial evening's drinking, that Burns should further tone down his political stance and instead turn his talents to less controversial topics. This advice infuriated Burns and as Syme tells it, with his eyes flaming red like coals he made to draw his Excise sword on his friend, but when his reckless actions dawned on him he sank to his knees in apologetic remorse. Sir Walter Scott's version was that Burns actually drew the sword from its scabbard.

=== The Galloway Tours ===
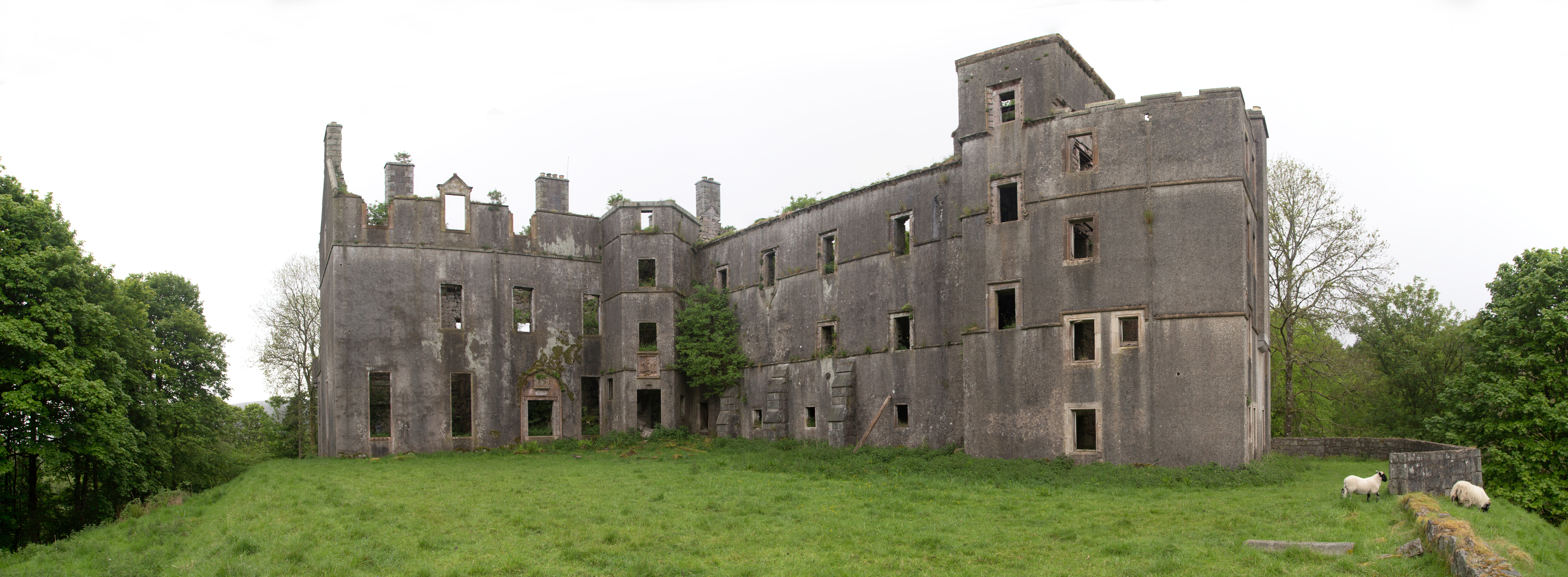
The ruins of Kenmure Castle, once the home of Viscount Kenmure.

On 27 July 1793 Syme accompanied Burns on his first tour of Galloway and on the first day they had supper with the laird John Gordon and his family at Kenmure Castle, followed by a sail on Loch Ken. A Mr Carson told an anecdote regarding this expedition: "... only the venerable pastor of Kells and the bard on board. The former, being too feeble to jump, as we had done, to land, expressed a desire to remain in the vessel till Mr Gordon and I returned; upon hearing which, the generous bard instantly slipt into the water, which was, however, so deep as to wet him to the knees. After a short entreaty, he succeeded in getting the clergyman on his shoulders; on observing which, Mr Syme raised his hands, laughed immoderately and exclaimed: 'Well Burns, of all the men on earth, you are the last that I could have expected to see priest-ridden!' We laughed also, but Burns did not seem to enjoy the joke. He made no reply, but carried his load silently through the reeds to land." Burns's expensive new boots may have been on his mind and indeed after becoming distorted during drying, Burns tore them whilst trying to put them on and they eventually had to be thrown away.

Burns is said to have recited a version of the 'Galloway or Covenanter's Grace' at St Mary's Isle, home of the Earl of Selkirk and this has become known as the 'Selkirk Grace.'

According to Syme, Burns presented him with a copy of 'Scots Wha Hae' on 1 August 1703. It is likely that Burns continued working on it until he eventually sent the finished version to George Thomson. Burns had recently visited the Battle of Bannockburn and various other influences on their journey may well have added to his creation of this epic work.

Between 26 and 28 June 1794 Syme accompanied Burns on a second short tour of Galloway, one that he did not mention to James Currie. A few letters do survive that give some details, however no journal was kept. They are known to have visited Symes's friend Patrick Heron of Heron at his Kerroughtree Estate. Syme had written to Heron regarding Burns, who was hoping that Heron would use his political influence to aid his promotion prospects in the Excise.

=== The Death of Robert Burns ===
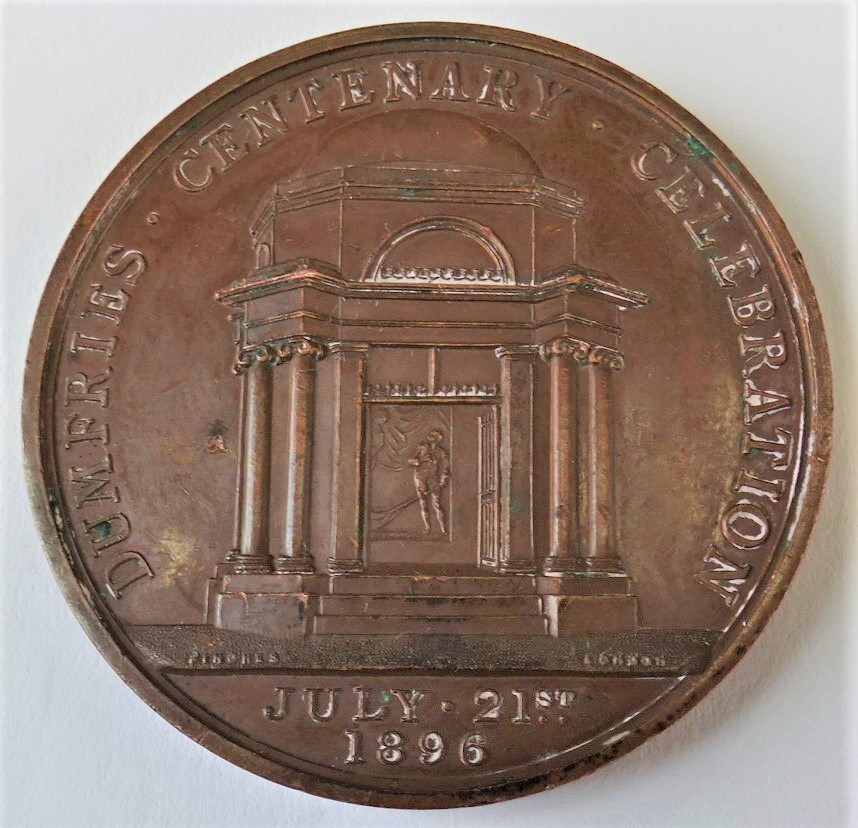
The Burns Mausloeum on his death centenary medallion.

Syme, as well as visiting Burns at the Brow Well on 15 July 1796, also went to see his friend a few days later at his home in Dumfries. Of Burns at the Brow Well he wrote:

On Sunday 17 July he wrote to Alexander Cunningham:"He, poor fellow, is in a very bad state of health. I really am extremely alarmed, not only by the cadaverous aspect and shaken frame of Burns, but from accounts which I have heard from the first Faculty here. But I entertain strong hopes that the vigor of his former stamina will conquer his present illness, and that, by care and the attention and advice he receives from Dr Maxwell, he will recover. I do not mean to alarm you, but really poor Burns is very ill. However, do not say whence you heard so.".

On the following Tuesday, after his visit to Burns at his Dumfries home, he wrote again: "I conceive it to be a task (you would not forgive me did I omit it) to mention now, that I believe it is all over with him. I am this minute come from the mournful chamber in which I have seen the expiring genius of Scotland departing with Burns. Dr William Maxwell told me yesterday that he had no hopes; today the hand of death is visibly fixed upon him. I cannot dwell on the scene."

On Thursday 21 July he wrote "Burns departed this morning at 5 o'clock. I will not enlarge on the mournful subject. Indeed, I can say no more at present on this event."

Jean Armour Burns informed Syme that Burns, on his death bed a day before he expired, was continually calling for him and Alexander Cunningham. His last words are said to have been: "Maxwell! Macmurdo! Syme! will none of you relieve me?"

Syme left some revealing, if emotional, reminiscences of Burns such as: "The poet's expression varied perpetually, according to the idea that predominated in his mind: and it was beautiful to mark how well the play of his lips indicated the sentiment he was about to utter. His eyes and lips, the first remarkable for fire, and the second for flexibility, formed at all times as index to the mind, and as sunshine or shade predominated, you might have told, a priori, whether the company was to be favoured with a scintillation of wit, or a sentiment of benevolent, or a burst of fiery indignation. I cordially concur with what Sir Walter Scott says of the poet's eyes. In his animated moments, and particularly when his anger was aroused by instances of tergiversation, meanness, or tyranny, they were actually like coals of a living fire."

Only one letter from Burns to Syme is extant, however living in the same area meant that letters would be only occasional. He wrote an unusually positive description of the Oswalds of Auchencruive: "By the way, did you ever, my dear Syme, meet with a man who owed more to the Divine Giver of all things than Mr Oswald? A fine fortune; a pleasing, engaging exterior; self-evident amiable dispositions, with an ingenious, upright mind, & that too informed much beyond the usual run of the young fellows of his rank and fortune; add to all this, such a woman!"

=== Syme, Gilbert Burns, James Currie and Burns's Biography ===
Syme was one of those who persuaded a very reluctant Dr James Currie to write Burns's biography. He spent three weeks at Currie's Liverpool home assisting his friend and accompanied by Gilbert Burns. Syme wrote to James Currie asking him to publicise the subscription for Jean and her children in the Midlands and Merseyside and as a result Currie raised the handsome sum of £73 10s amongst his wealthy friends in Liverpool.

=== The First Commonplace book ===
Burns's Commonplace Book of 1783–1785 was the first of three commonplace books that were produced by the poet. The contents cover drafts of songs and poems, observations, ideas, epitaphs, etc.

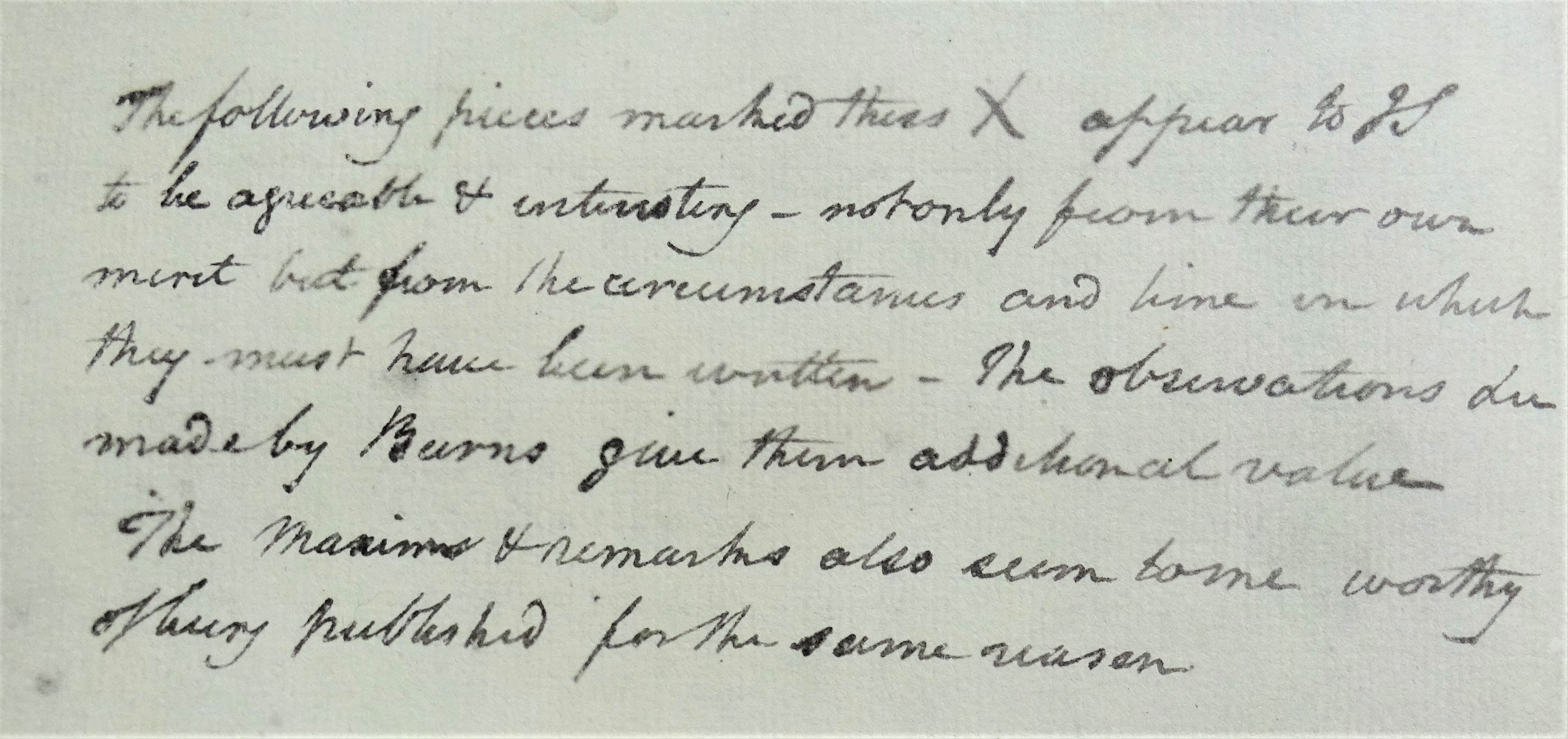
John Syme's comments from page 2 of the Commonplace book manuscript

Throughout the manuscripts are to be found comments and / or alterations, some by Robert Burns himself, the others by John Syme, James Currie, W. Scott Douglas and a 'W.R.'. These annotations are identifiable from their handwriting, appearance of the ink used, content, etc. As stated, Syme visited James Currie at Liverpool with Gilbert Burns. James Currie had possession of the manuscript from January 1797. William Scott Douglas (1878) apparently contributed at least one annotation, the "..ignorant critic" comment on page 13.

== Correspondence with Alexander Cunningham ==
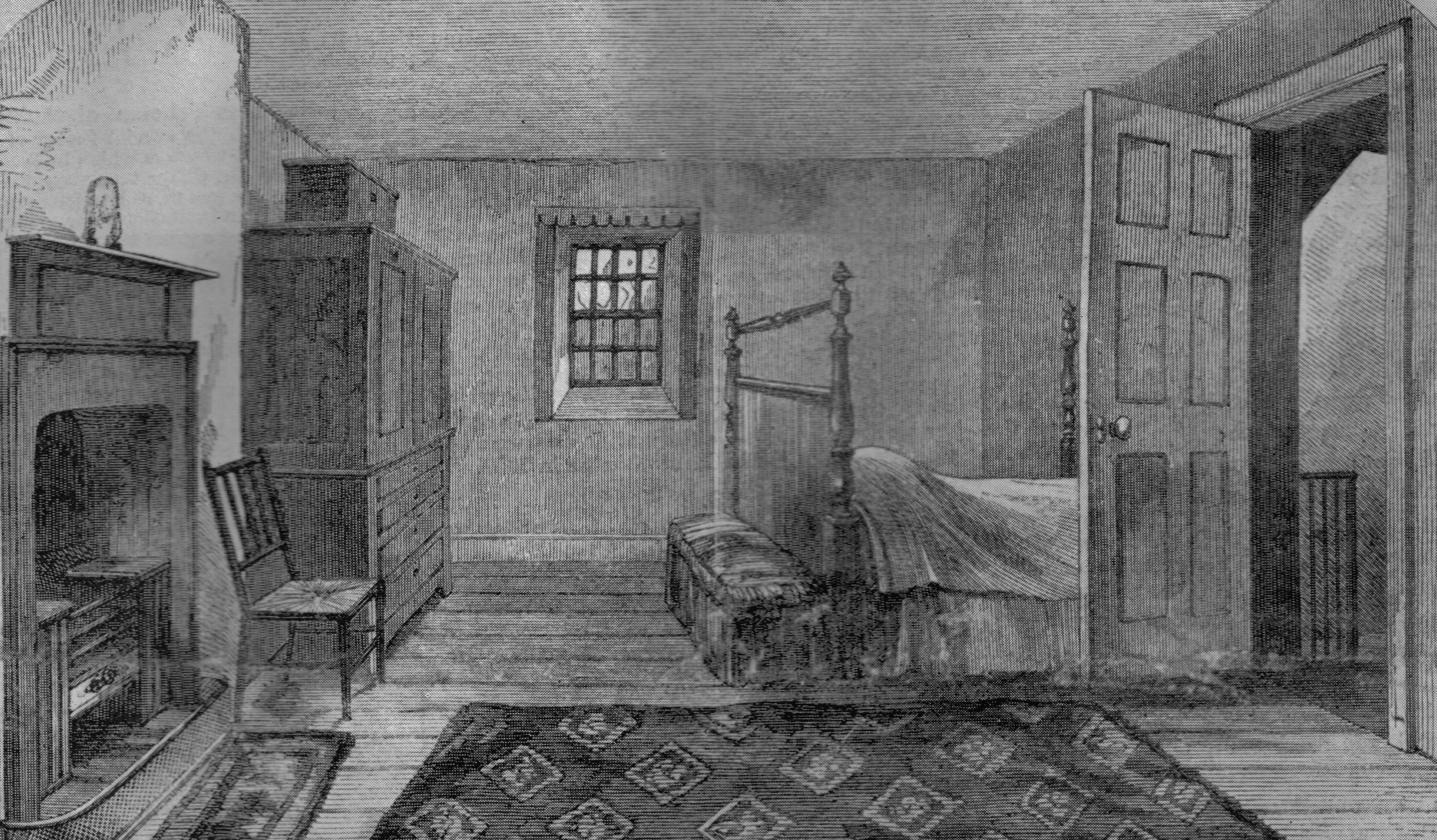
The room in which Robert Burns died.

As stated, only one letter from Burns to Syme is known, however an extensive correspondence between Syme and Alexander Cunningham survives.

Some ninety letters passed between Syme and Cunningham between 1786 and 1811 and after 120 years they were uncovered in the Cunningham family archives and gave many interesting insights into the life of the poet.

In 1797 Syme and Cunningham appealed for the loan of Burns's letters for a posthumous publication, only to receive a letter from Agnes Maclehose requiring the return of her letters and a visit from Robert Ainslie to force home the demand. The trustees did return them eventually, following her pledge to release his letters with hers remaining unpublished. James Currie censored much and did not even mention the relationship of Sylvander and Clarinda in his biography of the poet.

Syme, William Grierson, Alexander Cunningham and James Currie, through his biography, were central in raising the funds needed to build a suitable mausoleum to which Burns's body was moved in September 1815. Cunningham also had a role in securing James Currie's services as Burns's biographer.

Syme received a letter from Alexander Cunningham expressing his sorrow and grave disappointment at the number of Burns's supposed friends and admirers who would not donate to the fund and instead gave him "cold civility and humiliating advice."

== See also ==
- Robert Aiken
- Robert Ainslie
- Jean Armour
- John Ballantine
- Lesley Baillie
- Alison Begbie
- Nelly Blair
- Isabella Burns
- May Cameron
- Mary Campbell (Highland Mary)
- Jenny Clow
- Gavin Hamilton (lawyer)
- Helen Hyslop
- James McKie
