= A Select Collection of Original Scottish Airs for the Voice =

A Select Collection of Original Scottish Airs for the Voice is a multi-volume collection of Scottish song edited and published by the entrepreneurial musician, publisher and Clerk to the Board of Trustees for Encouragement of Art and Manufacture in Scotland, George Thomson. For the first volume, which appeared in 1793, Thomson commissioned the composer Ignaz Pleyel to provide musical settings. He subsequently expanded his scheme throughout his life in further volumes and editions.

== Contents ==
Between 1792 and his death in 1796, the poet Robert Burns contributed (for little or no remuneration) over 100 songs to the work, including hallmark productions such as 'My Luve is like a Red Red Rose' and 'Is There for Honest Poverty'. Other 'librettists' in the original first volume include Allan Ramsay, Peter Pindar, Andrew Erskine, Earl Kellie, Richard Brinsley Sheridan, as well as traditional song.

The first 'set' of the first volume of Original Scottish Airs begins with the song 'The Smiling Morn' (more commonly known as 'The Birks of Invermay'), a known favourite of the poet Robert Fergusson.

The title page of the first 1793 edition runs: A Select Collection of Original Scottish Airs for the Voice. To each of which are added Introductory & Concluding Symphonies & Accompanyments for the Violin & Piano Forte, by Pleyel. With Select & Characteristic Verses by the most admired Scottish Poets adapted to each Air, many of them entirely new. Also Suitable English Verses in addition to such of the Songs as are written in the Scottish dialect.

== Expansion ==
George Thomson continued to develop further editions of Scottish Airs throughout his life and, following its success, extend the principles he established to make similar gatherings of other national airs, commissioning European composers as disparate as Kozeluch, Haydn, Beethoven, Weber, Hummel and Bishop in the process. Thomson ultimately issued three separate folio collections: Scottish (6 volumes, 1793-1841), Welsh (3 volumes, 1809-1814), and Irish (2 volumes, 1814-1816).
