= Alexander Cunningham (lawyer) =

Scottish lawyer & friend of Robert Burns (1763-1812)

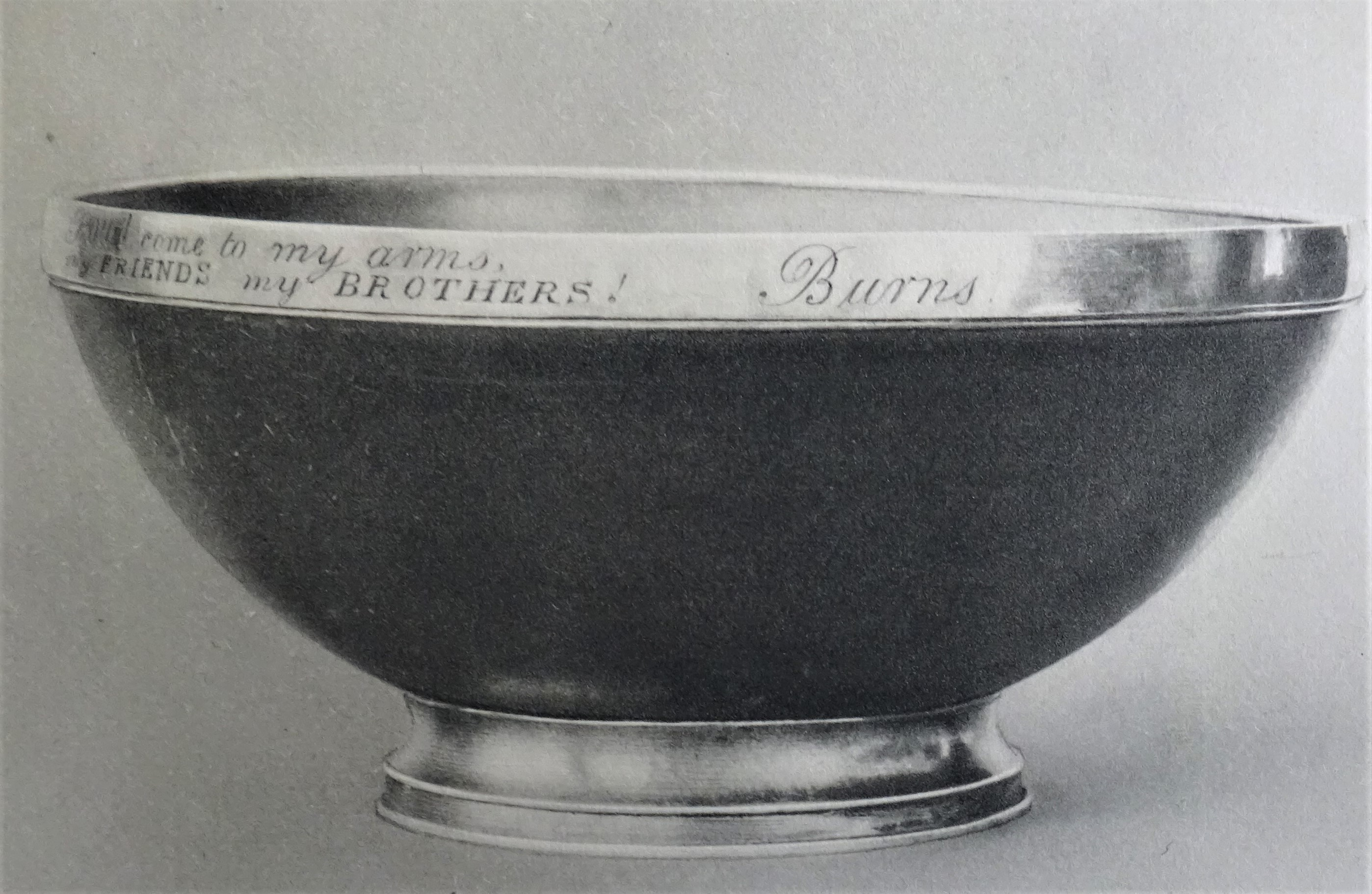
- Punch bowl given to Alexander Cunningham by Jean Armour Burns
- Born: Circa 1763
- Died: 1812; Greyfriars Kirkyard, Edinburgh
- Occupation: Lawyer or Writer

Alexander Cunningham was one of Robert Burns's closest friends from his time in Edinburgh. They stayed in contact, through at least 19 letters from the poet; and Cunningham was the ardent admirer who encouraged and joined others such as John Syme to raise funds for the poet's family after his death. Cunningham was one of the small group of associates whom Burns actively approached for constructive criticism of his work.

== Life and character ==
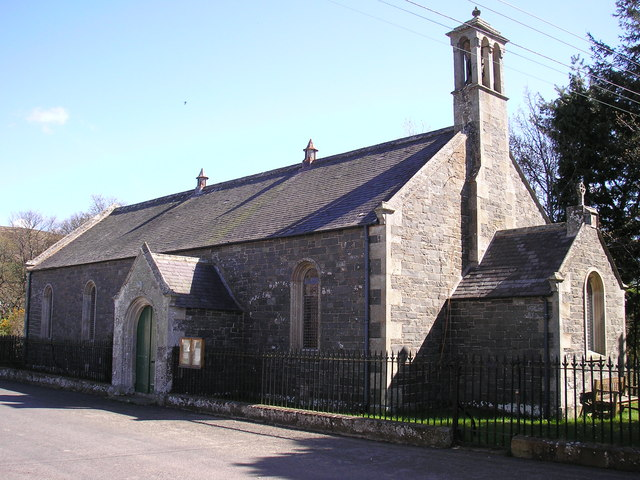
Kirkhope Kirk, Ettrickbridge.

He was the eldest son of James Cunningham of Hyndhope near Ettrickbridge in the Borders, and the nephew of William Robertson the historian. He practised law in Edinburgh and was a member of the Crochallan Fencibles where he socialised with Burns having met him at Masonic meetings in Edinburgh. As a student he had lived at No.6, St James's Square in Edinburgh and his near neighbours were George Thomson the music publisher, John Beugo the engraver, Robert Ainslie the lawyer and Alexander Nasmyth the painter, all closely associated with Burns's career.

In 1798 he became a Writer to the Signet, but later went into partnership with his uncle Patrick Robertson as a jeweller.

Cunningham courted Anne Stewart of East Craigs, however she married Dr Forrest Dewar in 1788 and the couple had a son and three daughters, having "prostituted her character" as Burns put it. Said to be devastated, he did however in 1792 marry Agnes Moir of Auchtertool, daughter of the Rev Henry Moir and the couple had two sons. Through his wife's dowry he inherited part of a valuable estate in South Carolina. Cunningham died in 1812 and was buried in the Greyfriars Kirkyard, Edinburgh.

The San Antonio Museum of Art in Texas holds a portrait of Alexander Cunningham by the famous artist Henry Raeburn.

== Association with Robert Burns ==
Burns probably first met Cunningham at Masonic meetings in Edinburgh as stated. He is listed as a subscriber to one copy in Burns's Poems, Chiefly in the Scottish Dialect (Edinburgh Edition).

Dugald Stewart, the eminent Scottish philosopher and mathematician, commented that Burns was keeping 'not very select society' however it was a matter of degree, Cunningham, Peter Hill, Ainslie, etc. being respectable, but not of the literati. Robert Ainslie, also training to be a lawyer, was a close friend of Cunningham and Burns.

Burns sent a version of "The Banks o'Doon" on 11 March 1791 inviting his 'strictures,' making him one of very few whose opinion he valued to that extent. He sent many other poems and songs to Cunningham, such as in the autumn of 1794 when he sent him a copy of "A red red Rose". His enclosed works were usually accompanied by letters.

In 1788 Burns said of Cuningham:

"My godlike Friend - nay do not stare,
You think the phrase is odd like;
But "God is Love," the Saints declare,
Then surely thou art godlike."

It was Cunningham who on 10 April 1792 put Burns's name forward to the Royal Company of Archers for a diploma, probably in recognition of his role in capturing the 100-ton schooner, the Rosamund and her cargo of contraband goods, in the Solway Firth on 29 February 1792.

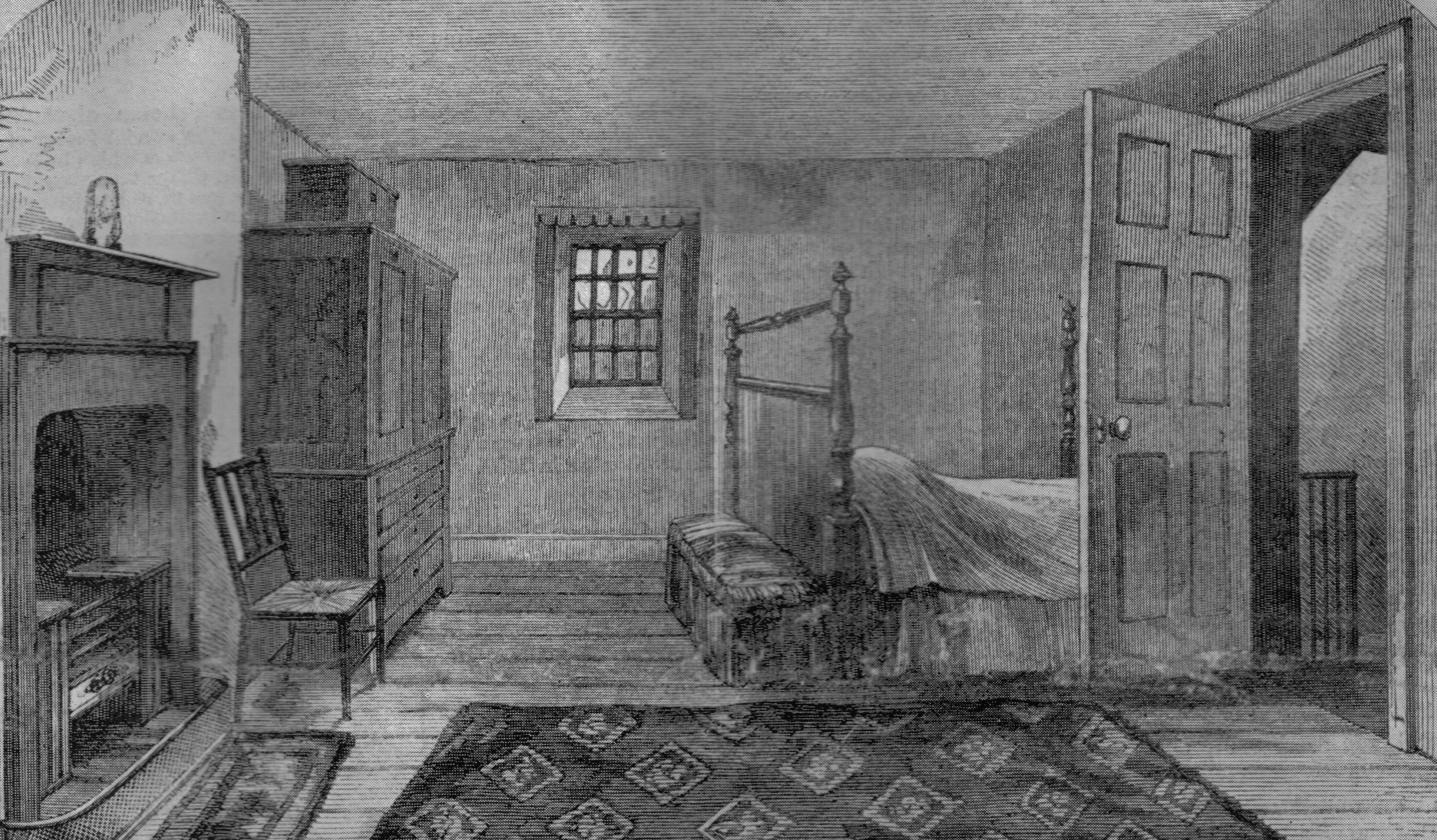
The room in his home at Dumfries in which Robert Burns died

In September 1792 George Thomson had finalised his plans for his Select Collection of Scottish Airs and it was Cunningham to whom Thomson turned to enlist the services of Robert Burns and in due course a letter of introduction together with details of the proposed publication was winging its way to Burns with positive results.

Robert Burns Junior wrote about life at the Mill Street house in Dumfries, recalling the arrival of the occasional barrel of oysters from Peter Hill the book seller or from Cunningham.

Burns had written to Cunningham on 7 July 1796 saying that he intended that his soon to be born child, if a boy, would be named 'Alexander Cunningham Burns' however Jean Armour seems to have been unaware of this and named their son 'Maxwell Burns' after Dr Maxwell who attended the birth. He was to die on 25 April 1799.

Jean Armour Burns informed John Syme that Burns, on his death bed a day before he expired, was continually calling for him and Cunningham.

=== The James Armour punch bowl ===
Of the many surviving Robert Burns artefacts few have such distinguished provenance as the punch bowl that was a nuptial gift in 1788 from James Armour to his daughter Jean and her new husband Robert Burns. As a stone-mason James had carved the bowl himself (22cm x 14cm ) from dark green Inveraray marble and after residing at their various homes, Jean in 1801 presented it to her husband's great friend and Burns family benefactor whilst she was on a visit to Edinburgh and staying with George Thomson. Cunningham had it mounted with a silver base and a rim, engraved upon which are “Ye whom social pleasure charms .. Come to my Bowl! Come to my arms, My FRIENDS, my BROTHERS!” taken from Burns's “The Epistle to J. Lapraik.”

Alexander died in 1812 and the bowl was then sold at auction in 1815 for the impressive price of 80 Guineas to a London publican who, falling upon hard times, sold it to Archibald Hastie Esq of London. A copy is held by the Robert Burns Birthplace Museum at Alloway, whilst the original is in the British Museum in London, presented to that institution by Archibald Hastie in 1858.

=== Correspondence with Burns ===
Burns shared with Cunningham many of his intimate thoughts and opinions on family life and his relationship with Jean, with comments such as informing Cunningham of his marriage and saying "When I tell you that Mrs Burns was once, 'My Jean,' you will know the rest. Of four children she bore me, in seventeen months, my eldest boy only is living." Cunningham in 1791 was involved in the onslaught of letters that Burns wrote to several of his friends and contacts in defence of his friend James Clarke, schoolmaster at Moffat. James was accused of using excessive corporal punishment and was eventually found innocent of the accusations. Burns sent several of his songs to Cunningham, such as "Here's a Health to Ane I Lo'e Dear" posted a few days before his death.

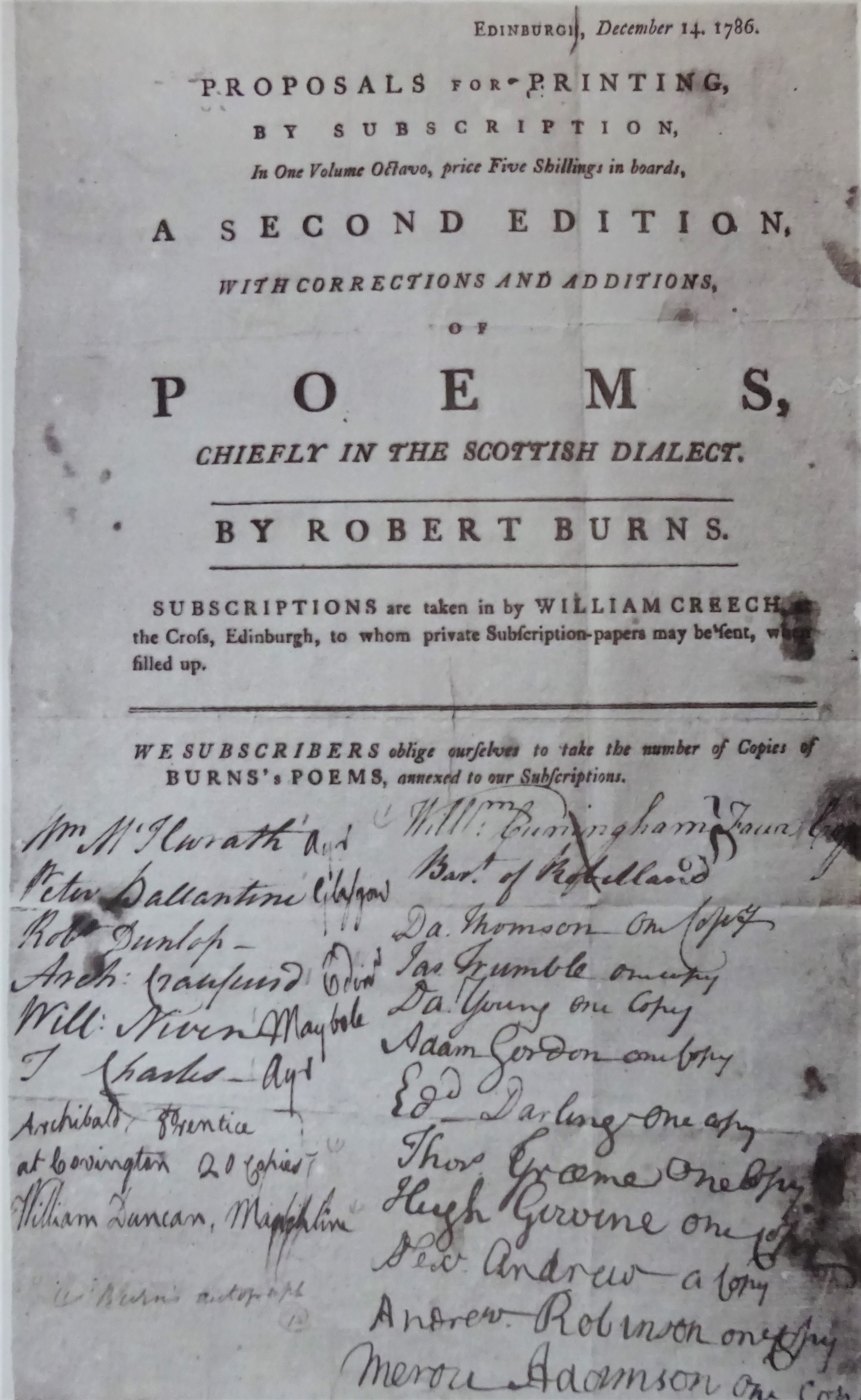
The Advertisement for the First Edinburgh Edition of 1787.

On July 27 1788 Burns wrote to Cunningham regarding his first love :

"And is thy ardour still the same?
And kindled still at Anna?
Others may boast a pastoral flame,
But thou art still a volcano.

On 8 August 1788 Burns wrote a diatribe against those with inherited rank and title saying "How wretched is the man that hangs on & by the favors of the Great! To shrink from every dignity of Man at the approach of a lordly piece of Self-consequence, who, amid all his tinsel glitter & stately hauteur, is but a creature formed as thou art - & perhaps not so well formed as thou art - came into the world a puling infant as thou didst, & must go out of it as all men must, a stinking corpse - & should the important piece of clay-dough deign to rest his supercilious eye over you, & make a motion as if to signify his tremendous fiat - then - in all quaking pangs & staring terrors of self-annihilation, to stutter in crouching syllables - 'speak! Lord! for thy servant heareth!!!' If such is the damned state of the poor devil, from my soul I pity him!".

On 4 May 1789 sent Cunningham a copy of "On Seeing a Wounded Hare limp by me, which a Fellow had just Shot" referring to the incident at Ellisland Farm involving James Thomson that nearly came to blows. Of the work Burns commented that "You will guess my indignation at the inhuman fellow, who could shoot a hare at this season when they all of them have young ones; & it gave me no little gloomy satisfaction to see the poor injured creature escape him. Indeed, there is something in all that multiform business of destroying for our sport individuals in the animal creation that do not injure us materially, that I could never reconcile to my idea of native Virtue & eternal Right."

The pro-Jacobite song "There'll Never be Peace Till Jamie Comes Hame" recalls the death of seven sons killed fighting for the Jacobite cause and was sent to Cunningham in 1790 with the comment that "When Political combustion ceases to be the object of Princes and Patriots, it then, you know, becomes the lawful prey of Historians & Poets."

On 24 January 1789 upon reading of Anne's marriage to Dr Dewar, Burns wrote :

"When I saw in my last Newspaper that a surgeon in Edinburgh was married to a certain amiable and accomplished young lady ..... I sincerely felt for a worthy much-esteemed friend of mine."

On 25 September 1789 Cunningham sent Burns a gift of the six volume set of Dr Samuel Johnson's 1781 Lives of the Poets. In the accompanying letter Cunningham wrote "Accept the copy of 'Lives of the Poets.' In addition to your value as my friend, it is a small tribute of the sincerity with which I admire you as one of their number. Let me indulge your every wish of my heart for your prosperity and happiness .... not always realised in the lives of those who have written for the instruction and entertainment of mankind."

As stated, on 5 February 1792, Burns wrote to Cunningham asking for his assistance in the case of James Clarke, the Moffat schoolmaster who was threatened with dismissal for his alleged cruelty to pupils in his charge.

On 20 February 1793 Burns wrote:

Quere, What is Politics?
Answer, Politics is a science wherewith, by means of nefarious cunning,
& hypocritical pretence, we govern civil Politics for the emolument of
ourselves & our adherents.

Quere, What is a Minister?
Answer, A Minister is an unprincipled fellow, who by the influence of
hereditary, or acquired wealth; by superior abilities; or by a lucky conjuncture
of circumstances, obtains a principal place in the administration of the
affairs of government.

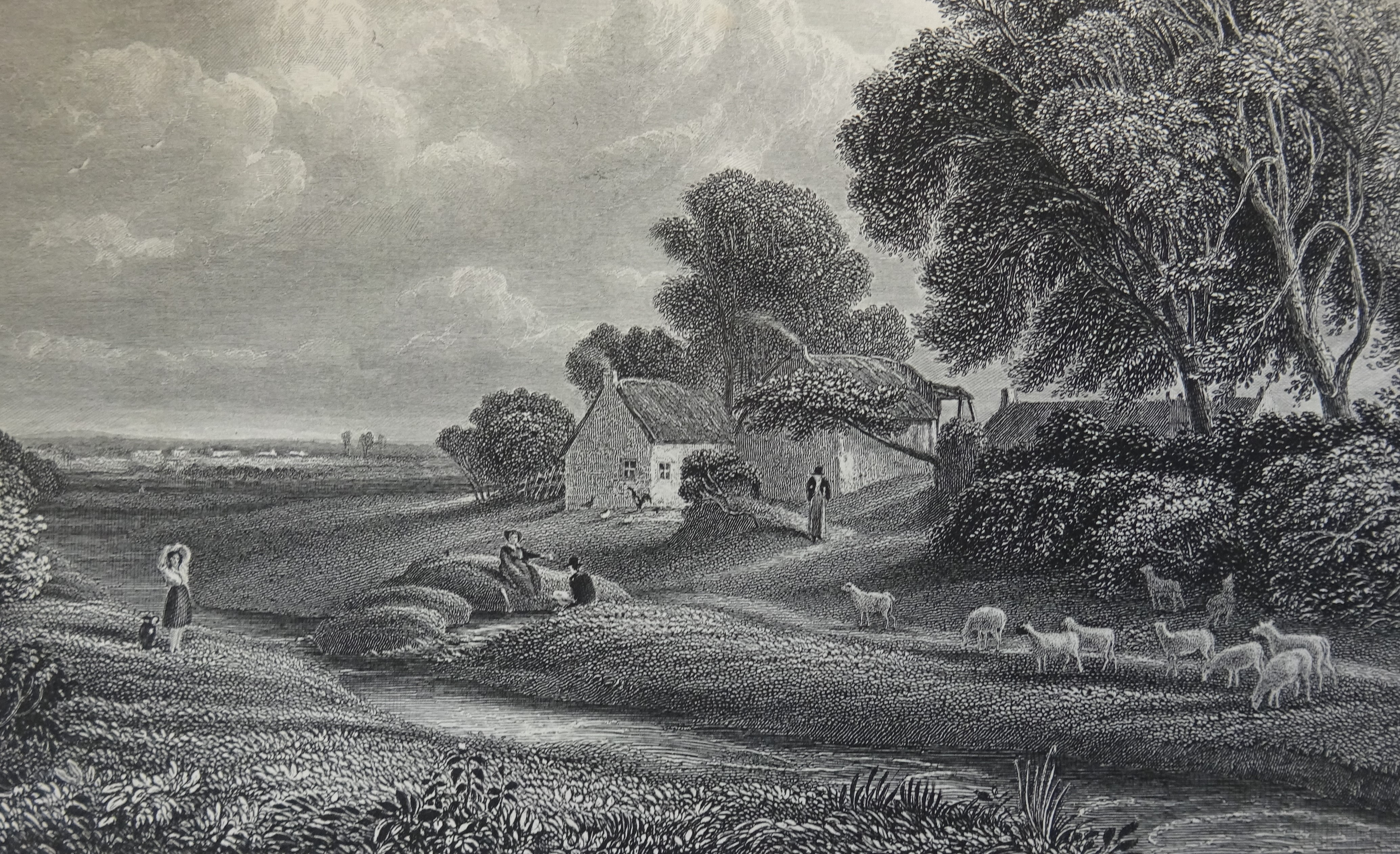
Brow hamlet and well

In July 1796 Burns wrote to Cunningham in an effort to use his friends influence, as a lawyer, to petition the Excise to pay him his full basic salary of £50 rather than his sick pay of £35.

Cunningham had thoughtfully written a flattering and comforting letter to Burns at the Brow Well for which he was deeply grateful.

On 7 July 1796 Burns wrote from Brow Well saying "Alas! My friend. I fear the voice of the Bard will soon be heard among you no more! For these eight or ten months I have been ailing, sometimes bed-fast & sometimes not; but these last three months I have been tortured with an excrutiating rheumatism which has reduced me to nearly the last stage. You actually would not know me if you saw me, pale, emaciated, & so feeble as occasionally to need help from my chair - my spirits fled!" He had made it clear that he was taking the cure at Brow on doctor's orders "The Medical folks tell me that my last and only chance is bathing & country quarters & riding."

The song "Here's a Health to Ane I Lo'e Dear" was his last correspondence with his long term friend, written on 10 July together some thoughts on how he could get his full pay from the Excise. Burns died on 21 July however Cunningham proved to be a friend to his memory and to the Burns family for many years after.

== Correspondence with John Syme ==
Some ninety letters passed between John Syme and Cunningham between 1786 and 1811 and after 120 years they were uncovered in the Cunningham family archives and gave many interesting insights into the life of the poet.

In 1797 Cunningham and Syme appealed for the loan of Burns's letters for a posthumous publication, only to receive a letter from Agnes Maclehose requiring the return of her letters and a visit from Robert Ainslie to force home the demand. The trustees did return them eventually following her pledge to release his letters with hers remaining unpublished. James Currie did not even mention the relationship of Sylvander and Clarinda in the biography of the poet.

Cunningham, John Syme and James Currie, through his biography, were central in raising the funds needed to build a suitable mausoleum to which Burns's body was moved in September 1815. Cunningham had helped secure James Currie's services as Burns's biographer.

Cunningham wrote to John Syme and expressed his sorrow and grave disappointment at the number of Burns's supposed friends and admirers who would not donate to the fund and instead gave him "cold civility and humiliating advice."

== See also ==
- Robert Aiken
- Jean Armour
- John Ballantine
- Lesley Baillie
- Alison Begbie
- Nelly Blair
- Isabella Burns
- May Cameron
- Mary Campbell (Highland Mary)
- Jenny Clow
- Gavin Hamilton (lawyer)
- Helen Hyslop
- Nelly Kilpatrick
- Jessie Lewars
- Anne Rankine
- Isabella Steven
- Peggy Thompson
