= George Thomson (musician) =

Scottish music publisher

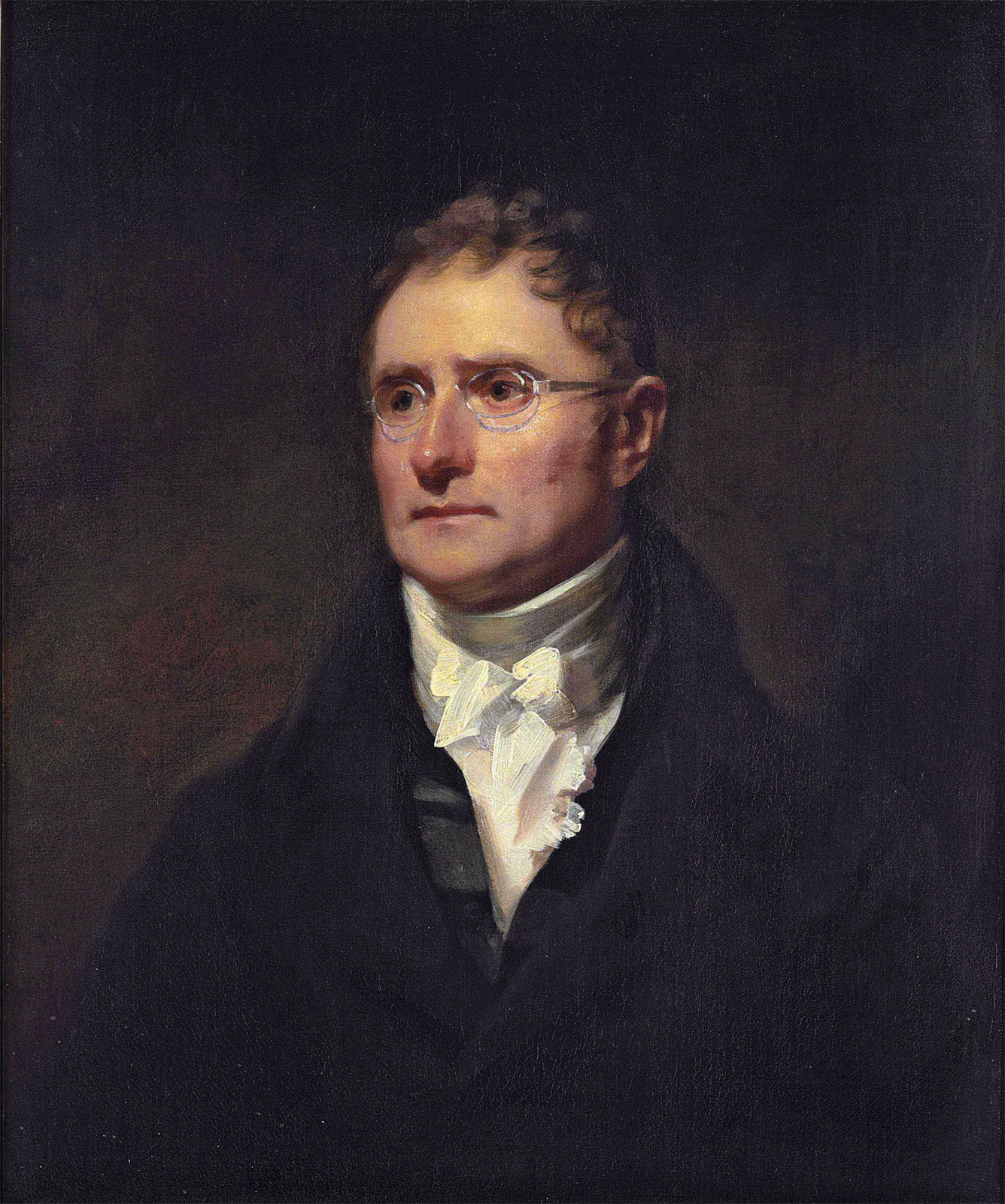
George Thomson by Henry Raeburn

George Thomson (1757–1851) was a Scottish music publisher and a friend of Robert Burns. He was clerk to the board of trustees in Edinburgh for 60 years. His A Select Collection of Original Scottish Airs for the Voice came out in six volumes between 1793 and 1841, and included contributions from Burns, Lord Byron, Thomas Moore, Walter Scott and Thomas Campbell. Thomson published folksong arrangements by Joseph Haydn, Ludwig van Beethoven, Ignaz Pleyel, Leopold Kozeluch, Johann Nepomuk Hummel, Carl Maria von Weber, Henry Rowley Bishop, and Robert Archibald Smith.

== Early life ==
George Thomson was born in 1757 in Limekilns, Dunfermline. His father was a schoolmaster at Limekilns and had some legal training. In 1780, Thomson gained a clerical appointment with the Board of Manufactures on the recommendation of John Home, and spent the rest of his career with this body, eventually rising to the position of Chief Clerk. He joined the Edinburgh Musical Society, playing the violin in the orchestra and singing in the choir. For 59 years he worked for the Board of Trustees for the Encouragement of Art and Manufactures in Scotland. His daughter Georgina was the wife of editor and music publisher George Hogarth, and his granddaughter Catherine married novelist Charles Dickens.

== Collection of Scots songs ==
Thomson played in the orchestra of the St Cecilia Concerts, enjoying performances of Scots songs by Italian castrati visiting Scotland. This gave him the idea of bringing out a collection of Scots songs with new accompaniments and respectable words. In the summer of 1792 he got Andrew Erskine, younger brother of the composer the Earl of Kellie, to take part in the project, but about fifteen months later Erskine, with gambling debts, ended his life by jumping into the Firth of Forth.

To continue the project Thomson asked Alexander Cunningham for a letter of introduction to Robert Burns and in September 1792 sent it with his letter stating that

"For some years past, I have, with a friend or two. employed many leisure hours in collating and collecting the most favourite of our national melodies, for publication.... we are desirous to have the poetry improved wherever it seems unworthy of the music.... Some charming melodies are united to mere nonsense and doggerel, while others are accommodated with rhymes so loose and indelicate as cannot be sung in decent company. To remove this reproach would be an easy task to the author of The Cotter's Saturday Night... We shall esteem your poetical assistance a particular favour, besides paying any reasonable price you shall please to demand for it".

Burns was already a contributor to James Johnson's The Scots Musical Museum and agreed to do the work, but indignantly added that "In the honest enthusiasm with which I embark in your undertaking, to talk of money, wages, fee, hire, etc. could be downright Sodomy of Soul! A proof of each of the Songs that I compose or amend, I shall receive as a favour."

== Select Scottish Airs ==
The first part of Thomson's Select Scottish Airs, brought out in June 1793, contained 25 songs by Burns. Thomson sent him a copy and, with the note that "you must suffer me to enclose a small mark of my gratitude, and to repeat it–afterwards when I find it convenient" a five-pound note. Burns responded indignantly

"that you truly hurt me with your pecuniary parcel. It degrades me in my own eyes. However, to return it would savour of bombast affectation; But, as to any more traffic of that Dr and Cr kind, I swear, by that HONOUR which crowns the upright Statue of ROBt BURNS'S INTEGRITY! On the least notion of it, I will indignantly spurn the by-past transaction, and from that moment commence entire Stranger to you!"

Thomson did not attempt again to make payments until, close to the end of his life, the dying poet desperately begged him for a further five pounds.

Burns gave his congratulations on the elegant appearance of the book, and Thomson soon decided, with the aid of his willing collaborator, to include "every Scottish air and song worth singing".

Burns kept on providing songs until a few days before his death, and became involved in a lot of correspondence with Thomson, responding to editorial suggestions and justifying reasons for altering an old song or writing a new song to a particular tune. This gives a valuable insight into his approach to Scots song. Once Burns had stated his wishes Thomson rarely argued back, but sometimes made alterations without consulting the poet and ignored the request of Burns to return unsuitable songs for Johnson to put into print. Burns made it clear that in giving one edition of his songs he was not giving away his copyright. Alternative English language versions of the songs were provided by John Wolcot under the pen name of "Peter Pindar", but after he withdrew in August 1793 Thomson persuaded Burns to produce the English verses as well as his Scots language lyrics.

Thomson frequently suggested "improvements" which Burns rejected. A particular instance was Scots Wha Hae where Thomson insisted on an alternative to the familiar tune, and had Burns alter his stanzas to suit, but was later forced by public pressure to restore the original version.

Burns wrote:

"You cannot imagine how much this business of composing for your publication had added to my enjoyments. What with my early attachments to ballads, Johnson's Museum, with your book, etc. Balladmaking is now as completely my hobbyhorse, as ever Fortifications was Uncle Toby's; so I'll e'en canter it away till I come to the limit of my race (God grant that I may take the right side of the winning post!) and then chearfully looking back on the honest folks with whom I have been happy, I shall say, or sing, 'Sac merry as we a' hae been'."

== See also ==
- Jean Lorimer (Chloris)
