= Wigtown Harbour =

Harbour in Dumfries and Galloway, Scotland

- Wigtown, Scotland; GB grid reference NX438547
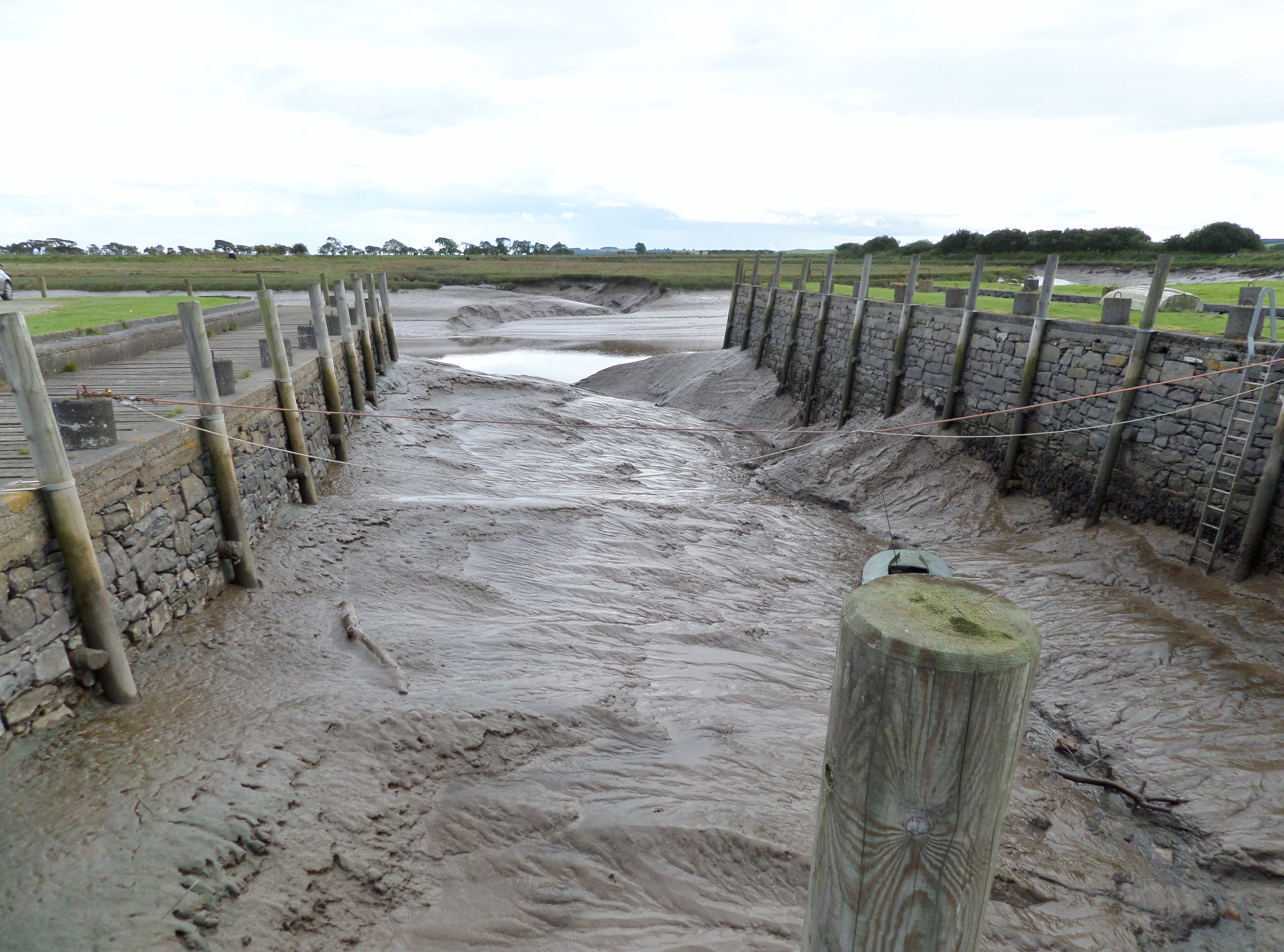
- Wigtown Harbour basin

Location
- Location within West Dunbartonshire
- Location within Dumfries and Galloway
- Coordinates: 54.862170°N 4.434535°W

Wigtown Harbour or Wigtown Quay was relocated in 1818 to serve the town of Wigtown and its hinterland in Wigtownshire, Dumfries and Galloway, following the silting up of the original natural harbour that was originally located near to St Machute's church (NX 43673 55707). This relocation occurred following centuries of silting and then the alteration of the course of the River Bladnoch that runs into Wigtown Bay where it joins the River Cree.

== Infrastructure ==
The new harbour built by the burgh lies to the south of the town and in 1818 consisted of a breastwork, an area of quay running parallel to the river with a rubble and wood frontage and a small rectangular basin of a similar construction. The harbour is of the simplest form with a quay and the addition of a basin that provided extra berths rather than protection from the elements. Several buildings were once located at the quay and harbour basin. Harbour Road provides access to the town from the area of the quay and harbour basin.

== History ==
From the 1400s the old Wigtown Harbour near St Machute's Church was the western terminus of the ferry across the River Cree and Wigtown Bay to Creetown. The silting of the River Bladnoch and Wigtown Bay interfered with ships sailing to Wigtown from as early as the 1600s. By the mid 1900s the new harbour built in 1818 to the south of Wigtown had ceased to function. It was recorded as disused in 1976. In the mid 1980s the 'new' harbour was restored and improved however it is once again heavily silted.

Wigtown Castle once stood on the original course of the River Bladnoch and helped to provide protection from English incursions coming across the Solway Firth.

== Workings details ==
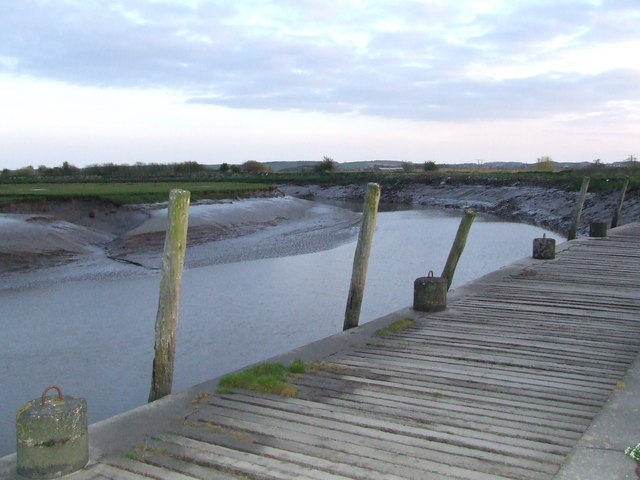
The Wigtown Harbour Quay and the River Bladnoch.

The harbour was built to accommodate ships of up to 300 tons and the commerce involved the unloading of lime, coal and manure. Farm produce was the main export. Herring fishing was not a major activity here. The trade by sailing ships 1845-49 was 3892 tons; 2080 tons in 54 vessels in 1856; in 1875, 1931 tons in 40 vessels; 1884, 1466 tons in 35 vessels. Steamers are not recorded as visiting Wigtown over these years.

Wigtown once had a customs house that monitored Wigtown Harbour and the creeks of Kirkcudbright and Wigtownshire.

A self-acting sluice and two other sluices are shown at the harbour in the 1850 OS Map linked to a water course that runs down from the area of the parish church past the site of the old castle. This arrangement resembles the water scouring system at the Kingholm Quay basin on the River Nith where water was stored behind a sluice and used to remove silt that is prone to accumulate in such river based locations.

== The site today ==
Considerable restoration and improvement works were carried out in the 1980s. The harbour basin has silted up however ships can still berth here and two slipways provide access to the river for smaller boats. A number of historical interpretation boards provide information for visitors and the car park on the quay sees moderate use by visitors to the bird watching hide that allows views across the large areas of salt marsh which have been designated as a Local Nature Reserve (LNR). In 2004 the first pair of ospreys to return to Galloway in over 100 years nested here.

== The Wigtown martyrs ==
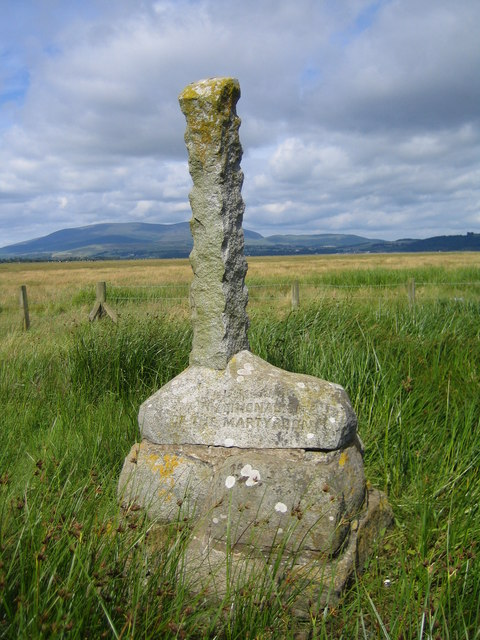
The memorial to the Wigtown Martyrs is located near to the old harbour that existed before the River Bladnoch changed its course in around 1818.

In the 17th century "The Killing Times" two local Covenanter women, Margaret McLachlan (various spellings exist), a woman in her 60s and the teenager Margaret Wilson were tried and sentenced to be drowned, as was the custom for condemned women at the time, but unusually they were tied to stakes to be drowned by the incoming tide. This dreadful act took place near the old harbour and the site is now marked by a memorial.

== See also ==
- Laghall Quay
