= Kelton Harbour and Village =

Architectural structure in Dumfries and Galloway, Scotland

- Dumfries, Scotland; GB grid reference NX994687
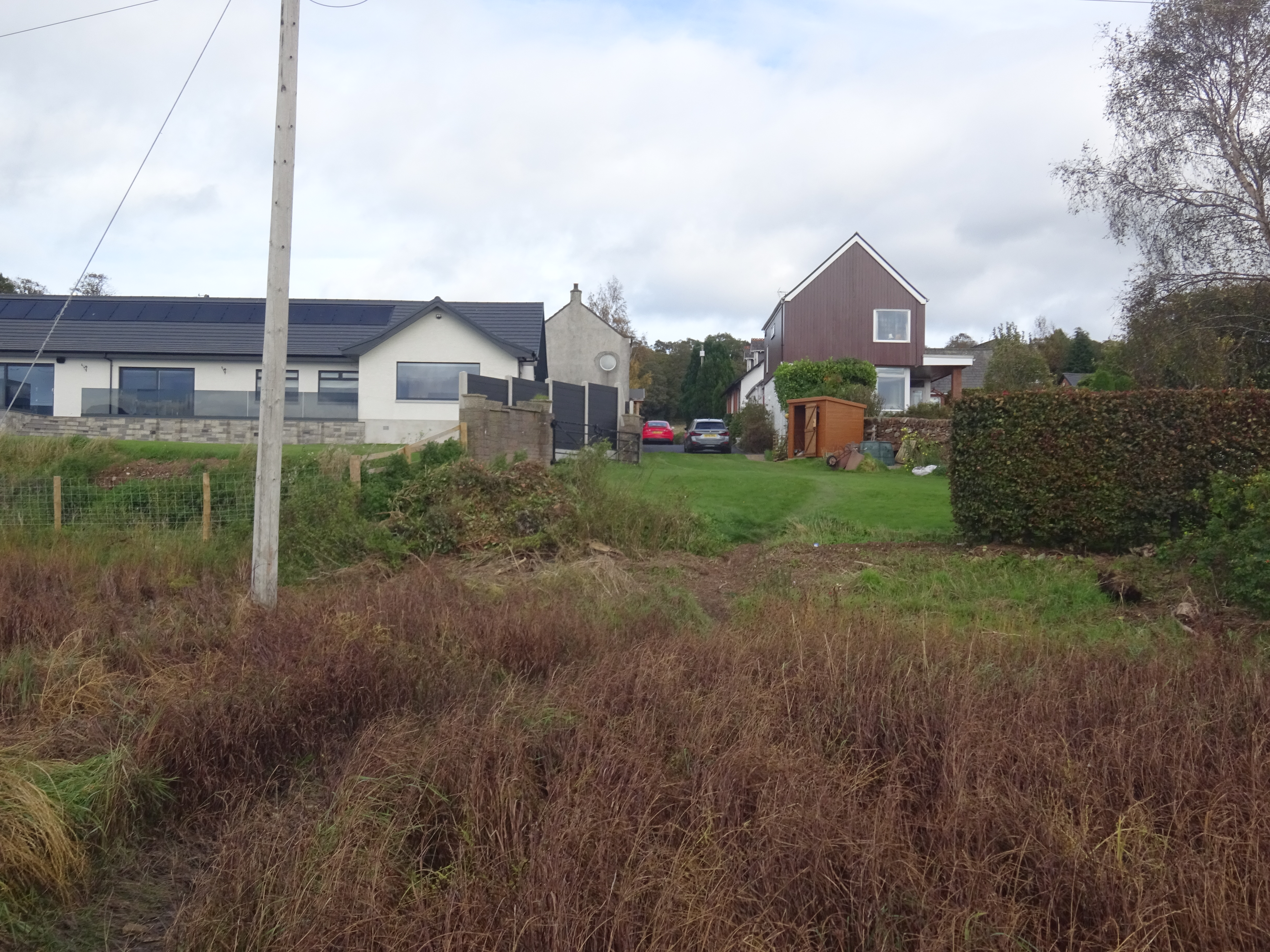
- Kelton Harbour site and the old Excise cottage

Location
- Location within Dumfries and Galloway
- Coordinates: 55.02173°N 3.58418°W

Kelton Harbour and Village (NX988708) are located on the East side of the River Nith opposite the Kirkconnell Merse, about 3.5 miles (5.6Km) from Dumfries and 1.5 miles (2.4Km) north of Glencaple Quay. The old harbour served the immediate area as well as its hinterland in Dumfries and Galloway. The quays at Dumfries, Kingholm Quay Laghall and Castledykes lay upstream and downstream jetties or quays were located at Glencaple Quay, Kirkconnell and Carsethorn.

The spelling Keltoun, Kellton and Kaltoun are also on record and the name may derive from the Scots Gaelic "cille" for a church or churchyard.

== Location and purpose ==
The old harbour site lies on the east bank of the River Nith. A stone quay is not shown on maps and no indications are today present at the site. The estuary bank here is flat and covers a significant area. Five mooring bollards are indicated in the area on the OS maps.

The River Nith was only fully navigable for vessels of from 60 to 70 tons, however ships of 300 tons could sail up as far as Glencaple, close to Kelton. The Solway Firth proper starts about 1.5 miles or 2.4 Kilometre below Kelton Harbour and at this point the Nith frequently shifts its Channel.

== History ==
=== The harbour ===
In 1851 it was recorded that Kelton had a small harbour, the depth rising to fifteen feet at spring tides, permitting anchorage for ships of ninety tons to berth at all times. Some of the mooring posts or bollards may have been made of granite, but at least two are old iron cannon, set muzzle downwards into the ground. Local knowledge indicates that these were made locally for use in the Crimean War and were flawed castings, so they were utilised as mooring bollards.

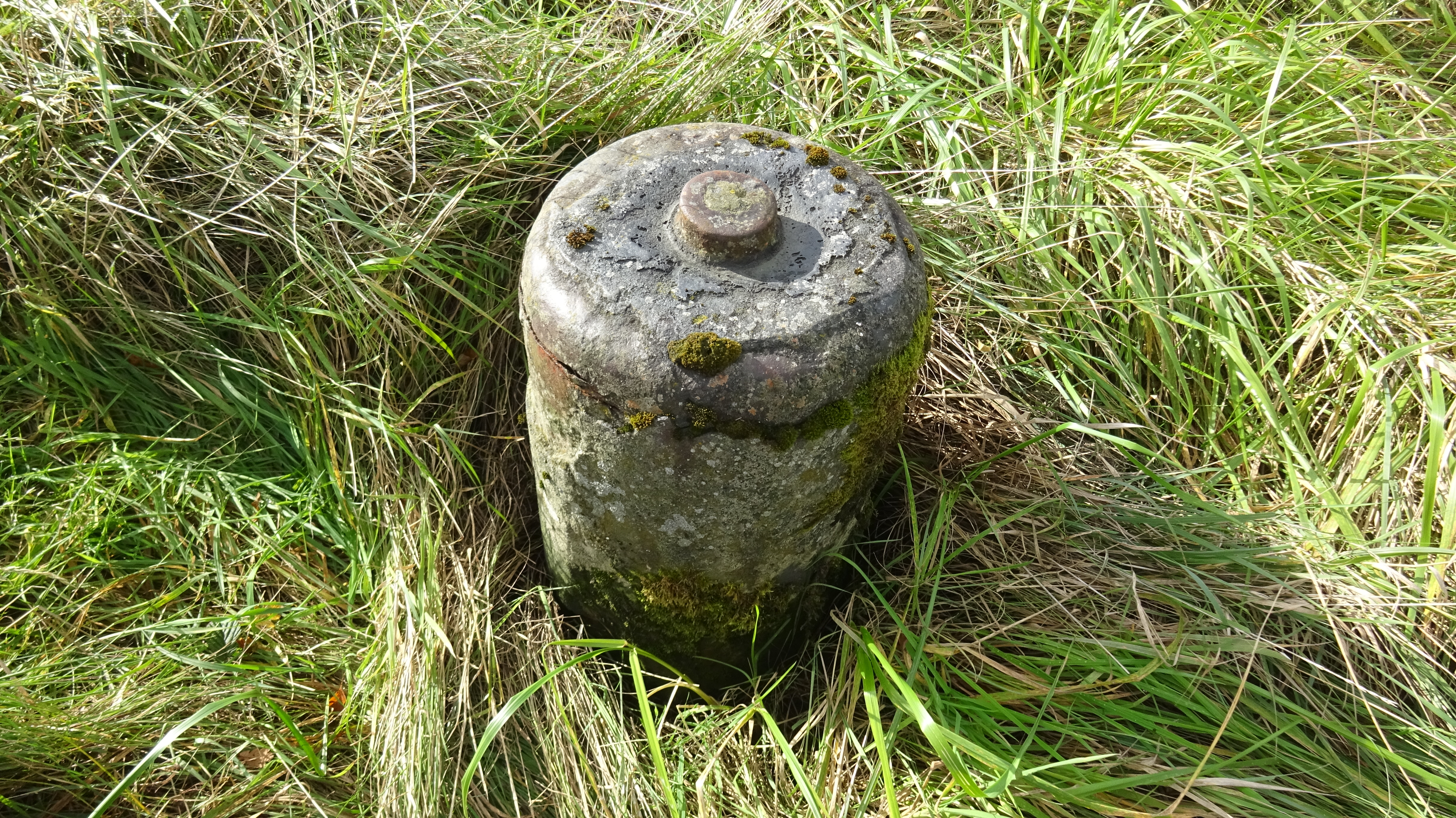
Old cannon wrer used as mooring bollards.

Farm produce, especially grain and potatoes was the main export from these Nith-side harbours, with heavy taxes having to be paid on certain imported goods, resulting in a very active smuggling trade and the poet Robert Burns who lived in Dumfries from 1791 to 1796, working as an Excise Officer or Gauger, may have visited Kelton Quay Excise post on official business or in connection with the 'Rosamond' incident. Burns's friend and physician Dr William Maxwell had been brought up at Kirconnell House, nearby on the West bank of the Nith, with its own private jetty.

The shipping trade in the area declined rapidly throughout the late 19th century and WWI saw the port of Dumfries come to a virtual standstill. Glencaple saw sporadic use by fishing vessels. Silting of the river and the use of larger ships that could not navigate the river were other contributory factors.

In connection with the local trade the Ordnance Survey records state that a few 'Coastal Vessels' were still being built at a Kelton boatyard as late as 1849. In 1856 five mooring posts are marked on the raised area beyond the riverbank, in 1899 the mooring posts were still marked.

=== The site today ===
It is not recorded when Kelton was last used for import and export of goods, however it is recorded to have been in serious decline in 1849 according to the Ordnance Survey. Two of the canon mooring posts are still visible. The old Excise post for the Harbour Officer is still present in a much modified state.

== The Rosamond connection ==
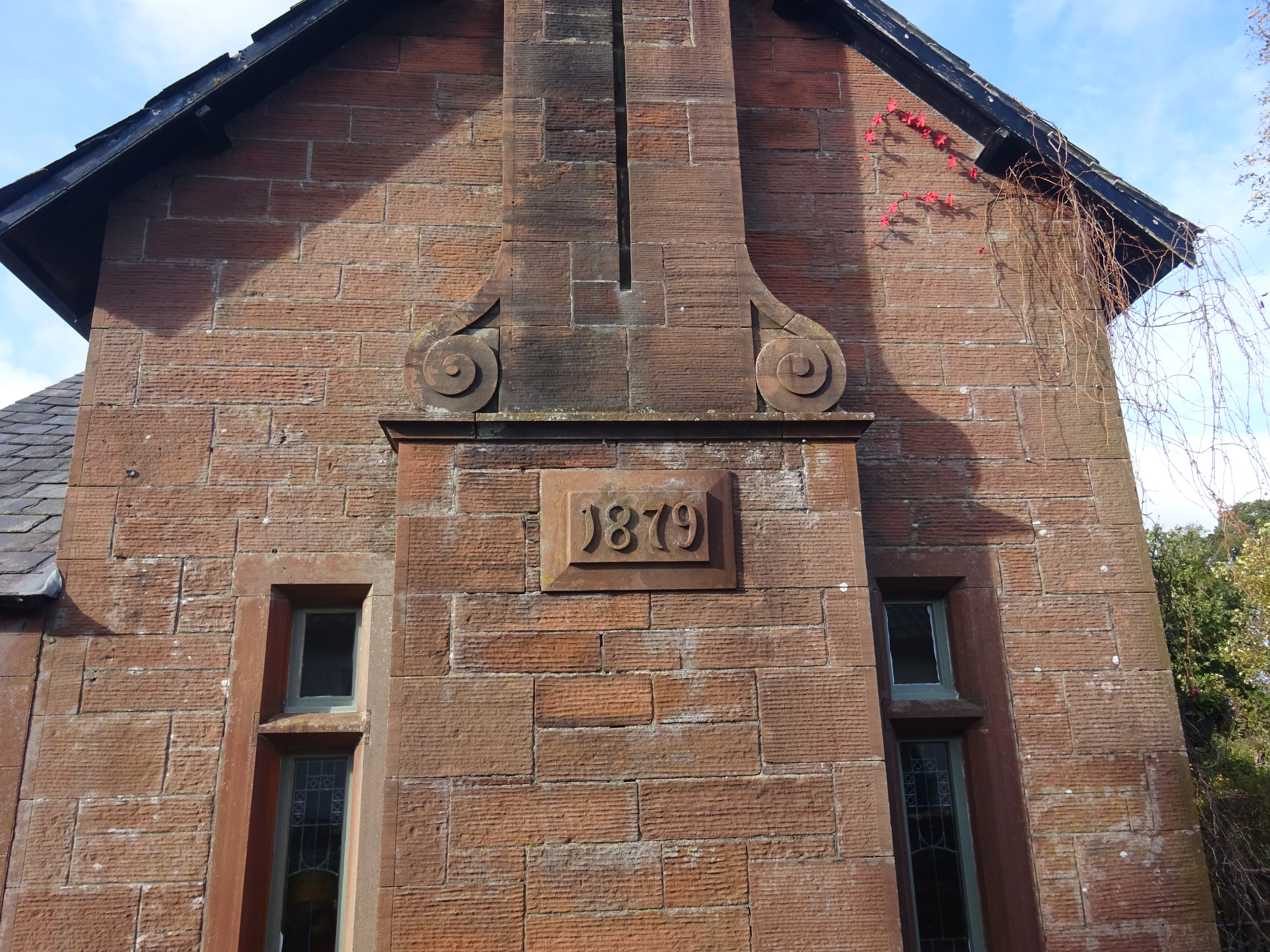
Date plaque on the old schoolhouse

On 29 February 1792 Robert Burns and excise colleagues were involved in an incident at Sarkfoot, south-east of Dumfries, near Gretna on the Solway Firth. The schooner Rosamond from Plymouth was operated by smugglers and as the available boats had been sabotaged by nearby residents, Burns, his colleagues and the dragoons had to wade out and after a skirmish they took control of the boat after the smugglers fled across the sands to Cumbria.

The smugglers had fired a 'carronade' through the ship's hull, however the excise employed two carpenters and four sailors who made her seaworthy again and she was taken to a berth at Kelton Harbour to be unloaded. The valuable cargo and fittings were sold at Dumfries in April for a profit of £120, some of which was given as a reward to Burns and the other excise officers.

It has been said that Burns purchased the 'Rosamond's' four carronades and attempted to send them via Dover to revolutionaries in France. This was not illegal at the time and the facts regarding the story are incomplete.

== Haaf Net Fishing ==
Haaf nets are stored in the old harbour area. Haaf netting involves the fishermen standing chest-deep in the estuary, using large submerged framed nets to scoop up salmon that swim towards them. This method of fishing is believed to have been brought to Britain by the Vikings over a thousand years ago and to have been practised in the Solway Firth since that time.

=== The village ===
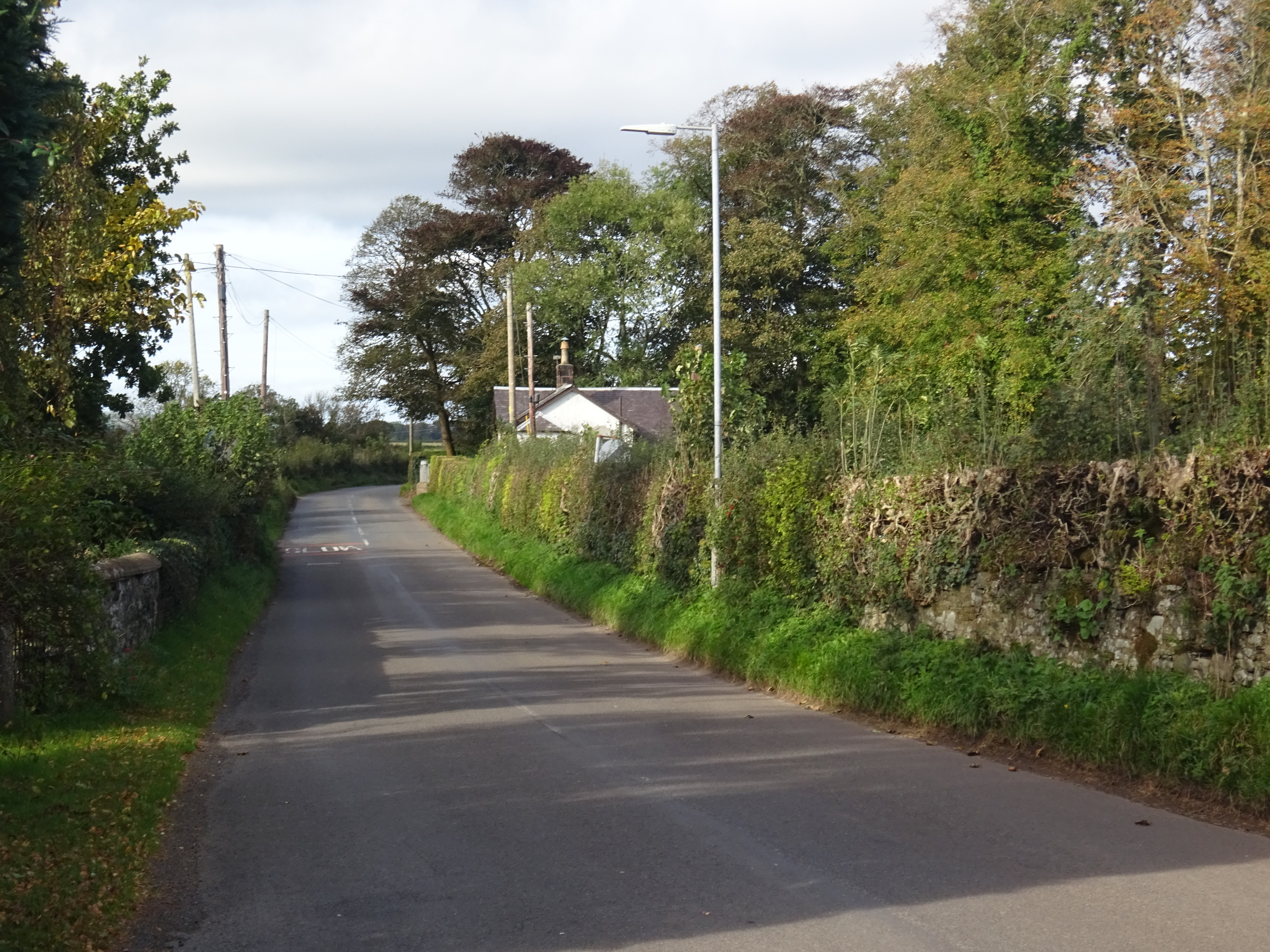
Kelton Lodge

The Dumfriesshire OS Name Books, 1848-1858 record that "Steel but being little cared for they have little or no repute The villages are Gasstoun, Lochbriggs, Georgetown and Kelton all of minor..." It is irregularly built and the houses are in bad repair, which are occupied by working people. "It presents a wretched and dilapidated state and as a village and port must soon be numbered among the things that were. In it is one Public house also a small Shipbuilding yard, but wherein a visiter to realize its pretensions would be taxed to Launch the imaginative germe to find a burthen for its stocks."

In 1804 a small group of buildings were located next to the Nith with a High Kellton and Kellton Head nearby. A lane runs directly to the riverbank. In 1856 the OS map shows two rows of cottages with gardens and some ruins. A building is shown on the other side of the road to the then hamlet and a long path runs from a well to a building that may have once been the tavern. In 1894 the buildings are much the same however a school and schoolhouse had been built in 1879 and an aviary was present, built by the owner of the nearby Kelton House.

In 1851 Samuel Lewis's "A Topographical Dictionary of Scotland" stated that Kelton had 154 inhabitants and that at one time considerable trade through the village involved the export of grain and potatoes.

In 1899 a gate and lodge is shown nearby to the north with a driveway that leads eastwards to Kelton, a small and recently built mansion house with a newly built home farm close by. A second larger mansion, Kelton House, stood to the north.

By the 1960s the site of the old woodyard had become an adjunct to the original hamlet and a village had effectively been formed. The nearest church seems to have been at Glencaple.

=== The Woodyards ===
In 1856 two woodyards, the second being at North Boreland, are recorded on the OS map with saw pits, mills, wells and associated cottages. A smithy within a row of cottages is shown facing the river. The location permitted felled trees to be brought to the site from the river. A path runs parallel to the river, connecting the various parts of the settlement. The 1899 OS shows a woodyard apparently disused as it is not named, with no smithy marked either. The second woodyard seems to have vanished without trace. In 1947 the site of the northern woodyard shows a number of buildings with no indication of the site being an active sawmill. By the 1960s the site had become resedential and an adjunct to the original hamlet.

== The Nith Bore ==
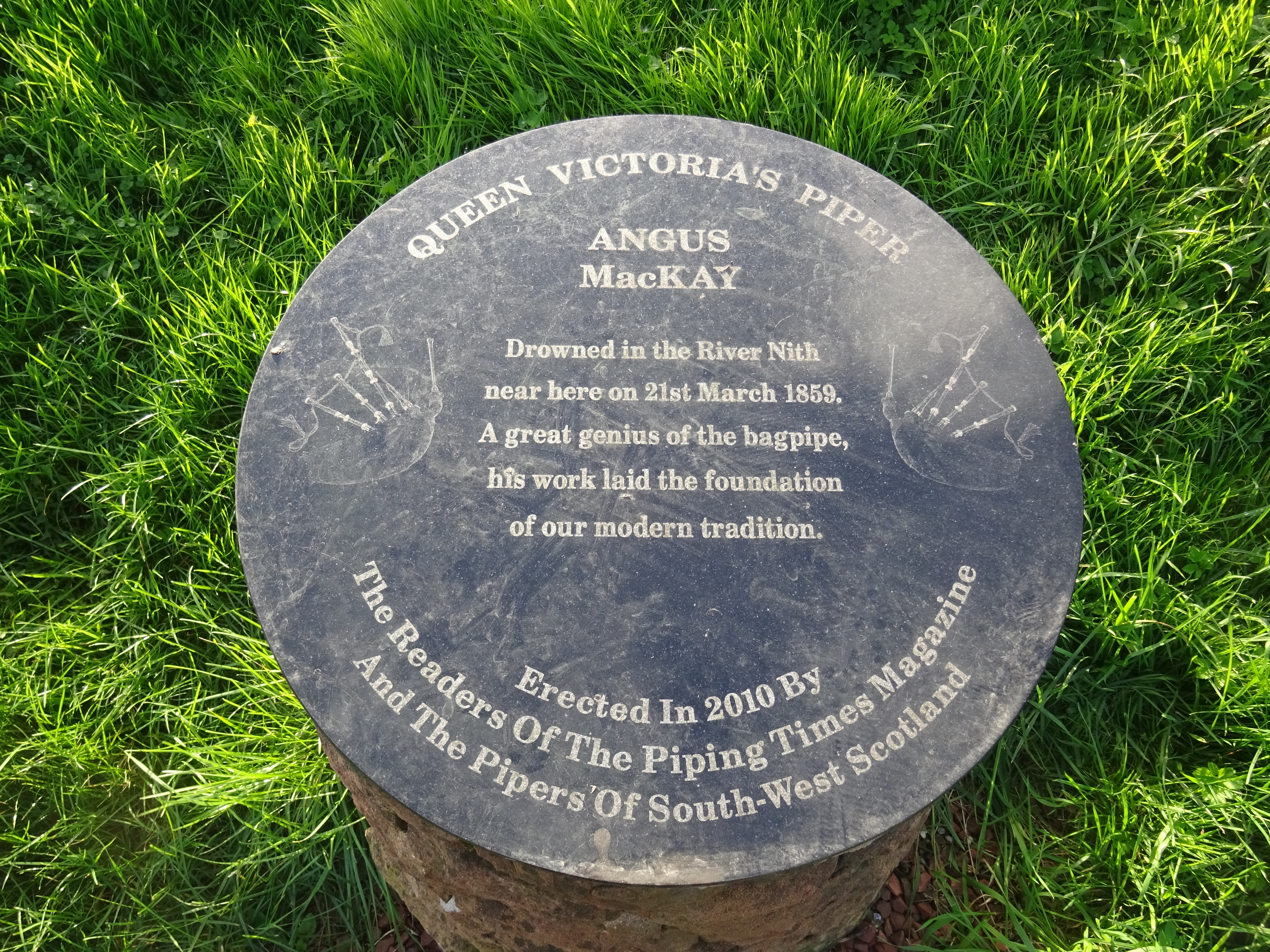
Memorial to Queen Victoria's piper Angus McKay.

The River Nith is one of only 15 or so rivers in the UK that exhibit a tidal surge, aegir or tidal bore. The incoming tide is forced by the shape of the land to form a wave of water that travels against the river current up this funnel-shaped river. The surging water can often be heard before it is seen. The shallow Nith flows into the wide, flat Solway estuary and when conditions are right, as with high spring tides and with favourable winds, the 'Bore' is created, scouring the river banks in its progress inland and potentially interfering with boats on the river and those that were moored at the time. The scouring effect of the bore is clearly visible through the lack of vegetation on the river banks.

== Memorial to Angus McKay ==
Near to Kelton is the memorial to Angus Mckay, the first royal piper, serving Queen Victoria. Later he was a patient at the Crichton Royal Institution in Dumfries. He died on 21 March 1859 after escaping and is presumed to have drowned in the River Nith. A memorial was placed at the site of his disappearance to commemorate his life in 2010.
