= Kingholm Quay =

- Dumfries, Scotland; GB grid reference NX438547
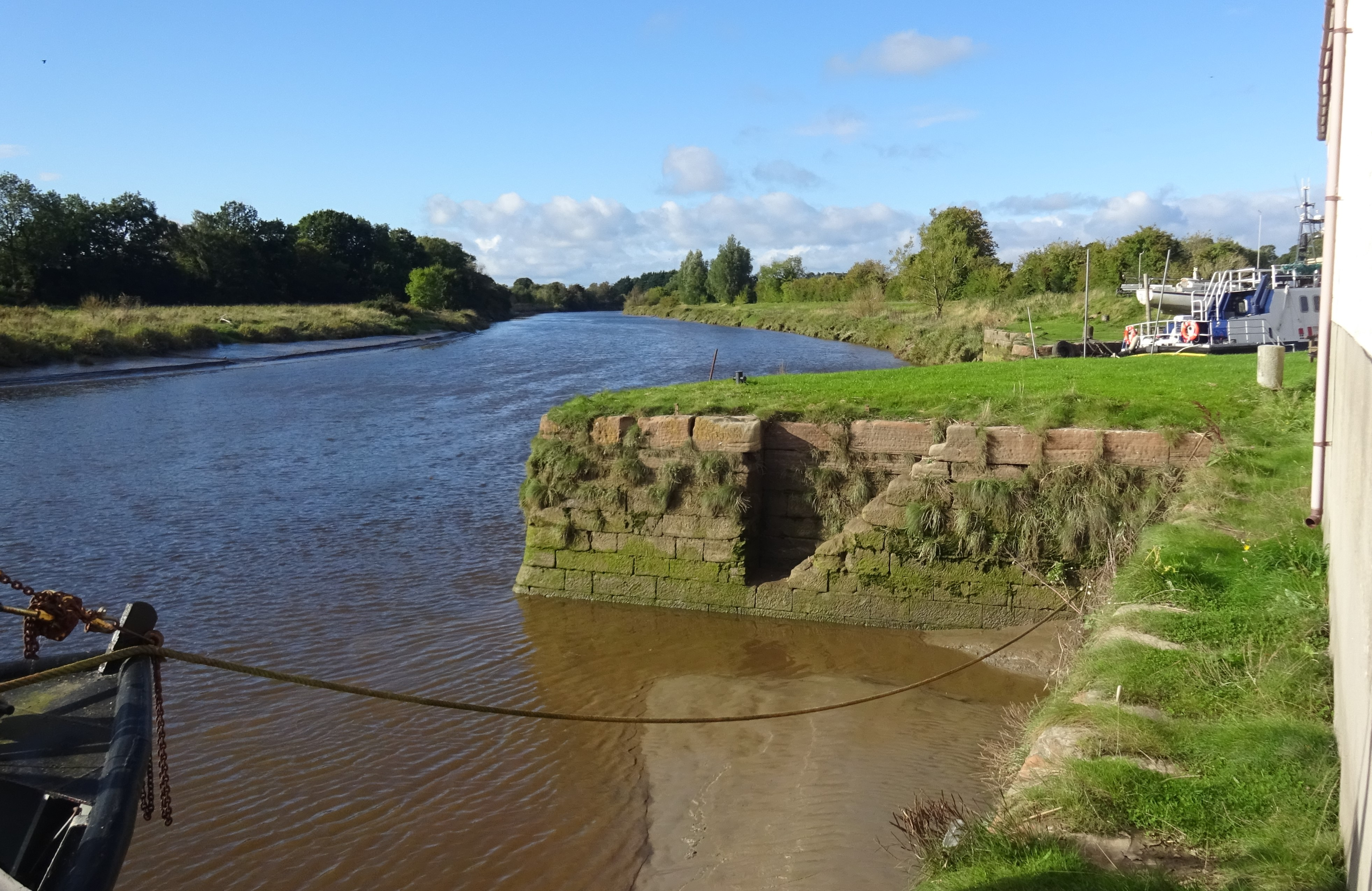
- Kingholm Quay on the River Nith

Location
- Location within Dumfries and Galloway
- Coordinates: 55.046294°N 3.6051920°W

Kingholm Quay, commonly called the New Quay (NX975735) in the 19th century and its associated village and warehouses is located on the River Nith, once serving the town of Dumfries and its hinterland in Dumfries and Galloway. The port of Dumfries lay upstream and downstream quays or harbours were located at Laghall, Kelton, Glencaple, Carsethorn and Kirkconnell Jetty. It is not clear whether Kingholm was home to a fishing fleet of any sort. Mavisgrove Merse lay opposite.

== Infrastructure ==
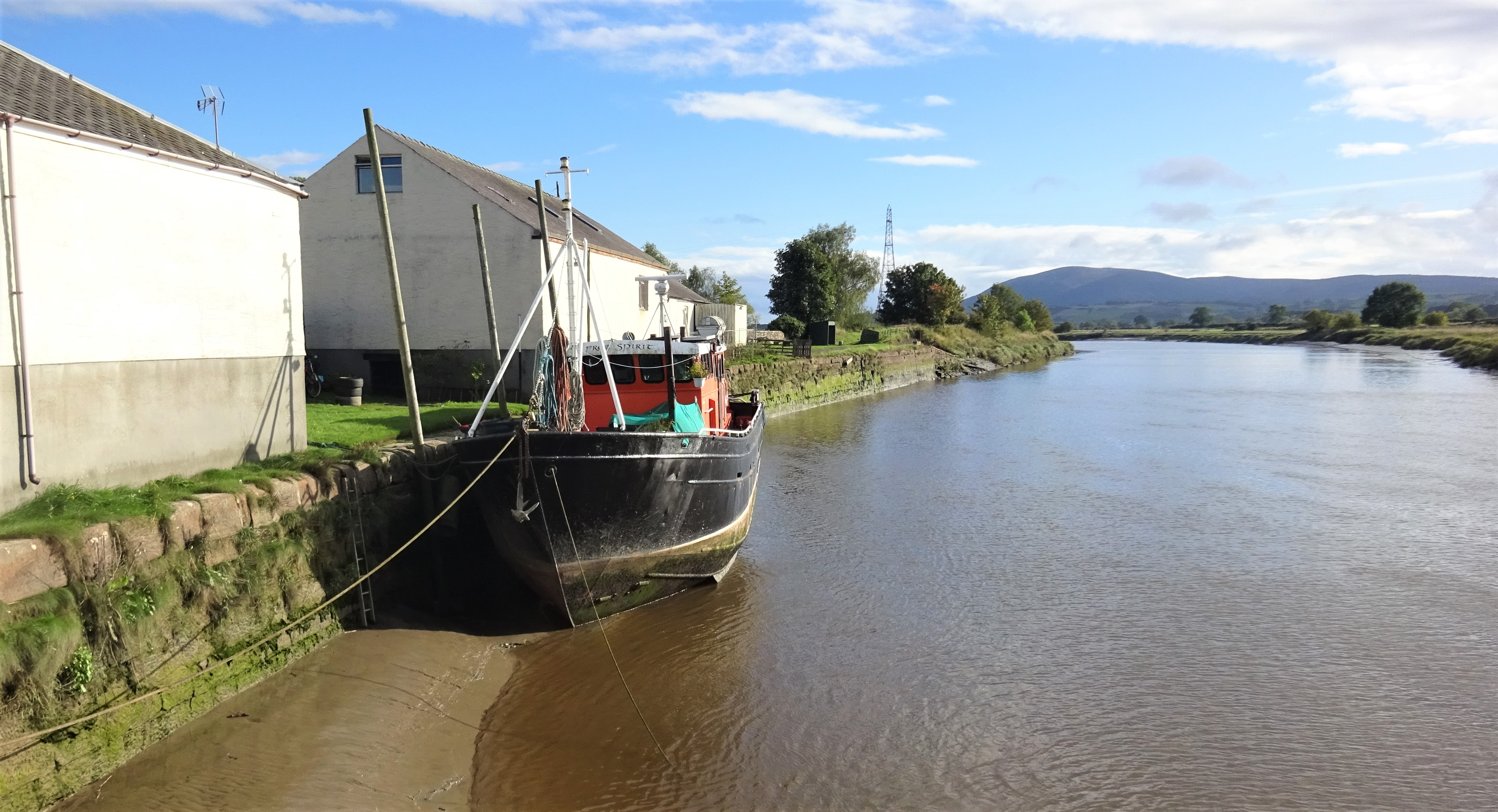
The riverside quay and slipway in the background

The quay lies on the east bank of the River Nith and has a single basin with associated red-brick, single-storey transit sheds. The basin was built to expand the number of berths rather than for shelter. Two storey dwelling houses and three-storey and attic and four bay-bay warehouses are contemporary with the 19th century improvements. Many of the moorings are made of granite, but a few are old iron cannon, set muzzle downwards into the quayside. Local knowledge indicates that these were made locally for use in the Crimean War and were flawed castings, so they were utilised as mooring bollards.

In 1856 the port and village had two public houses, the two storey 'Ship Inn' and the single storey 'Sailors Return' with substantial warehouses, two gasometers, a woollen mill and a gunpowder magazine. In 1848/58 the Ship Inn's landlady was a Mrs Anderson and the Sailor's Return's landlord was John Young. In 1893 the 'Ship Inn' is no longer marked on the OS map. The village once had a Grocer's shop and the steam powered woollen mill gave employment on average to about 200 people. This woollen mill was three storeys high and employed wool pickers, spinners weavers, etc. the main cloth produced was for trousers, plaids, etc. A bone mill producing bone dust as a fertiliser formerly stood nearby, but has been demolished.

In 1907 neither inn is recorded, but two new warehouses are shown either side of the basin, however the dam and sluices are not marked and the basin is marked 'mud'. By 1829 the mill was processing oatmeal and feeding stuffs, however warehouses had been built along the river front quay, with one demolished on the north side of the basin. A 'Lodge' is shown near where the magazine once stood.

== History ==
The holm is said to have derived its original name, Comyn's Holm, from the then owners. After King Robert the Bruce killed the Red Comyn in 1306 at Dumfries the name was altered to King Holm. King Holm was given by King James to the Burgesses of Dumfries for recreations such as archery, especially the 'shooting for the Silver Gun' competition.

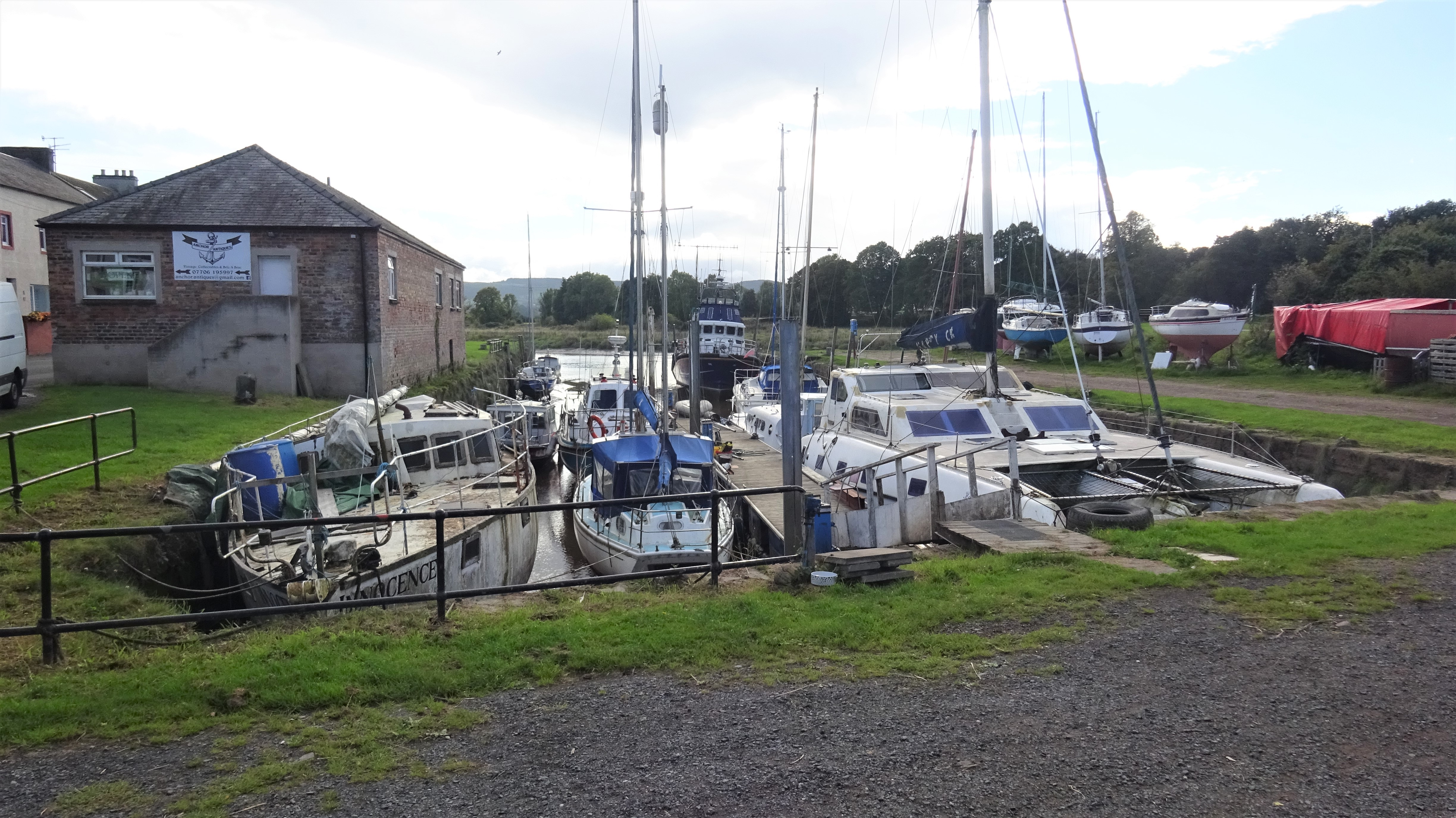
The basin, quays and a warehouse

A place for boats to lay up was present in 1707; in 1747 a quay was developed and in 1836-40 much of the present infrastructure was built. John Lewars map of 1808 shows a few buildings at Kingholm and a "Pousance Island" between it and the west bank. Dumfries town had installed three weirs on the west bank upstream from Kingholm and on the east bank had built an earth bank running from the King Holm to the river and then a stone wall with a gap runs to "Pousance Island", all designed to protect the harbour area. The island is shown surrounded by shingle, a firm footing upon which boats may have laid. The site is shown without any stone built quays, but two buildings stand at right angles to each other and a lane is shown running down from Dumfries marked as the "New Quay" road. The Spring Tide depth is shown as ten feet.

An 1812 map or plan shows Kingholm with a basin and quays without the presence of Pousance Island. The name 'Pousance,' a variation on 'Puissance' in Anglo-Norman means 'Power, might or Authority' and also occurs as a surname or a first name. The trading links with France may provide an explanation. In 1812 only a basin and quays are shown at Kingholm. The 'Pousance Island' is still shown on the map in 1848.

In 1848 the village had a population of a hundred and three inns were present, the Ship Inn being the largest. By 1856 the 'New Quay Loaning' had been built so that Kingholm was now connected at both ends of the village to the roads into Dumfries.

The poet Robert Burns lived in Dumfries from 1791 to 1796, working as an Excise Officer or Gauger and may have visited Kingholm Quay on official business as well as in his leisure time. His friend and physician Dr William Maxwell lived at Kirkconnell House on the west bank of the Nith, with its own jetty as previously mentioned.

== Workings details ==
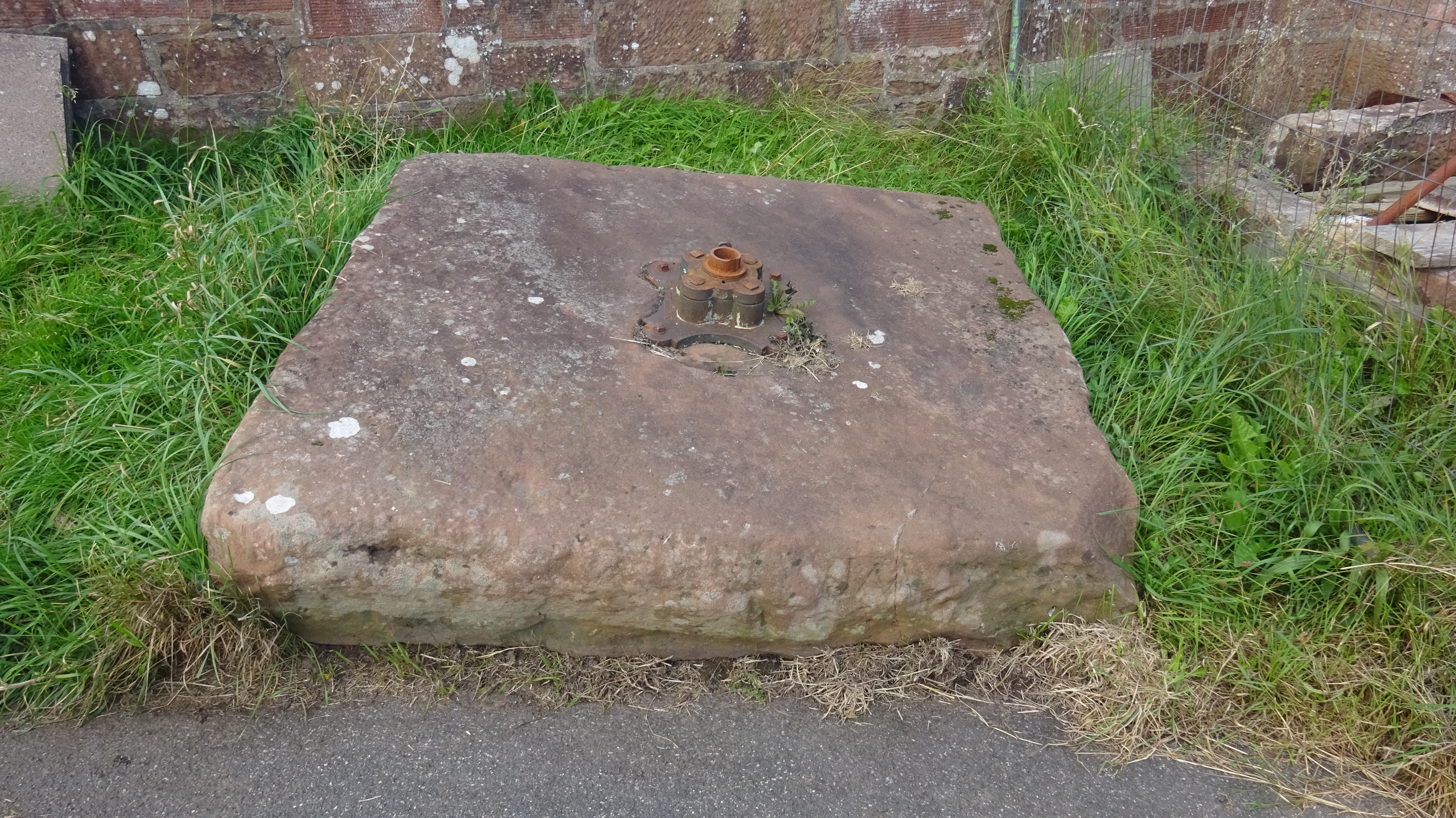
Part of the old sluice scouring system for the silt in the basin

Laghall Quay on the west bank in 1848/58 was a small but safe harbour with mooring-place for two Vessels of about 50 or 60 Tons and imported mainly coal and timber whilst Kingholm Quay was described as a small but safe harbour with mooring places for about twelve vessels of about 60 or 80 tons. The harbour imported are coal, bones, Guano, timber, etc. and exported various kinds of farming produce.

As stated, the harbour's facilities were built in 1747 and rebuilt in 1836–40. The commerce at Kingholm involved the import of tobacco from the North American colonies and unloading cargoes of lime and coal. Dried fruits, wines, brandy and luxury textiles were imported from Spain and France.

A Victorian water scouring system existed here from circa 1856, where a pen or dam created a considerable head of water to build up in the King Holm itself from the waters of the Kingholm Burn and when a sluice was opened the power of the water was directed through two sluices either side of the basin that would then scour the accumulated silt away and wash it into the River Nith. A similar arrangement existed at Wigtown Harbour.

Today the harbour has a basin and a quay running parallel to the river with moorings and warehouses.

== The site today ==
Considerable restoration and improvement works have been carried out recently (datum 2022). The harbour basin has a floating pontoon and ships can berth here with a new slipway slightly downstream providing access to the river for smaller boats. The site is owned by the Nith Navigation Commissioners and the Port of Dumfries Development Group have carried out improvements, such as the construction of the aforementioned slipway. An information point giving details of the history of the harbour has been placed next to the slipway.

The River Nith has recently been dredged to permit access to the quay and Kingholm offers a variety of wintering options for all sizes of pleasure craft and small commercial vessels.

== The Nith Bore ==
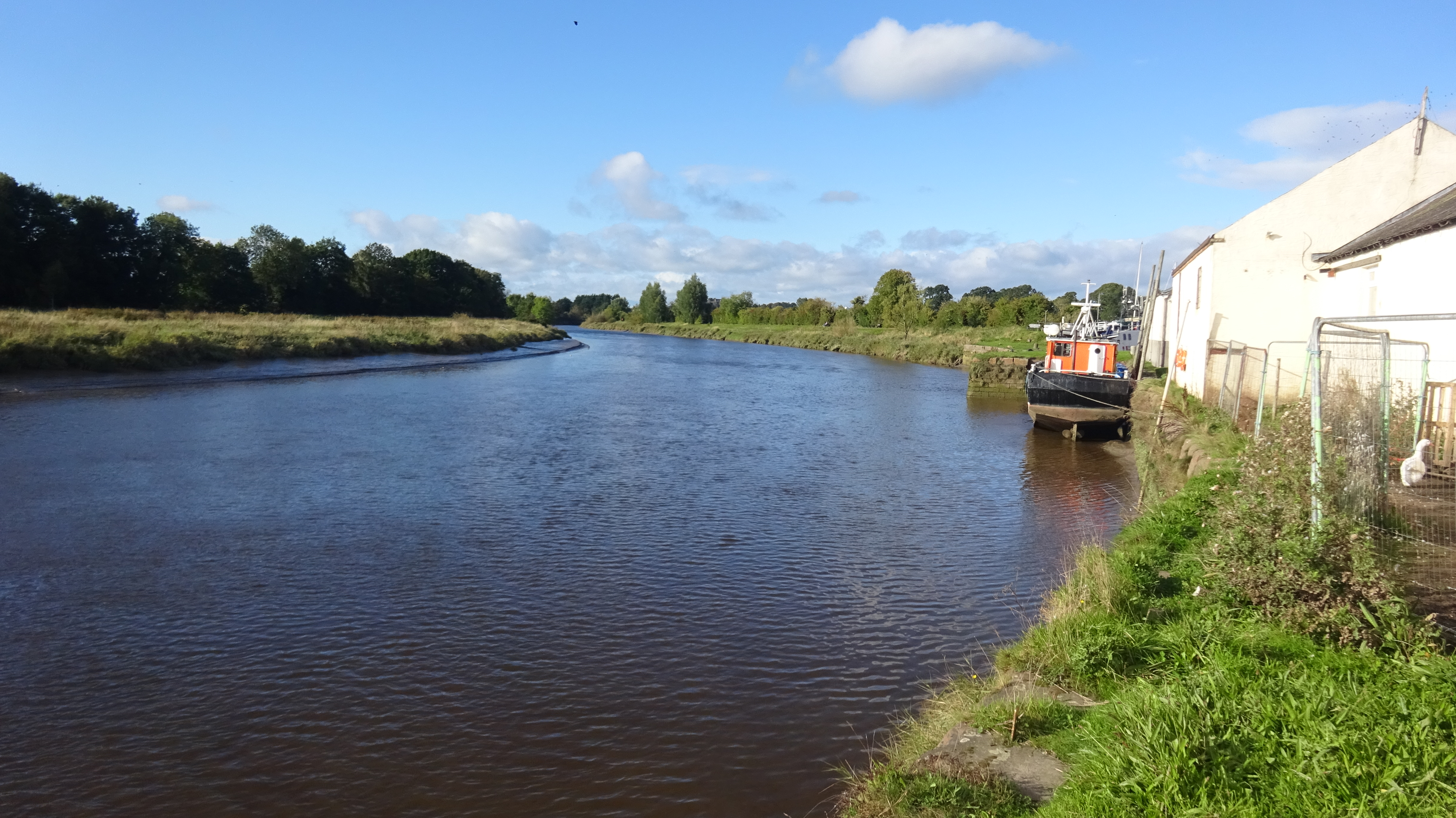
The River Nith looking upstream to Dumfries

The River Nith is one of only 15 or so rivers in the UK that exhibit tidal surge or aegir, better known as tidal bore. The incoming tide is forced by the shape of the land to form a wave of water that travels against the current up this funnel-shaped river. The surging water can often be heard before it is seen. The shallow Nith flows into the wide, flat Solway estuary and when conditions are right, as with high spring tides and with favourable winds the 'Bore' is created, scouring the river banks in its progress inland and potentially interfering with boats on the river and those that were moored at the time.
