= Glencaple Quay =

Architectural structure in Dumfries and Galloway, Scotland

- Dumfries, Scotland; GB grid reference NX994687
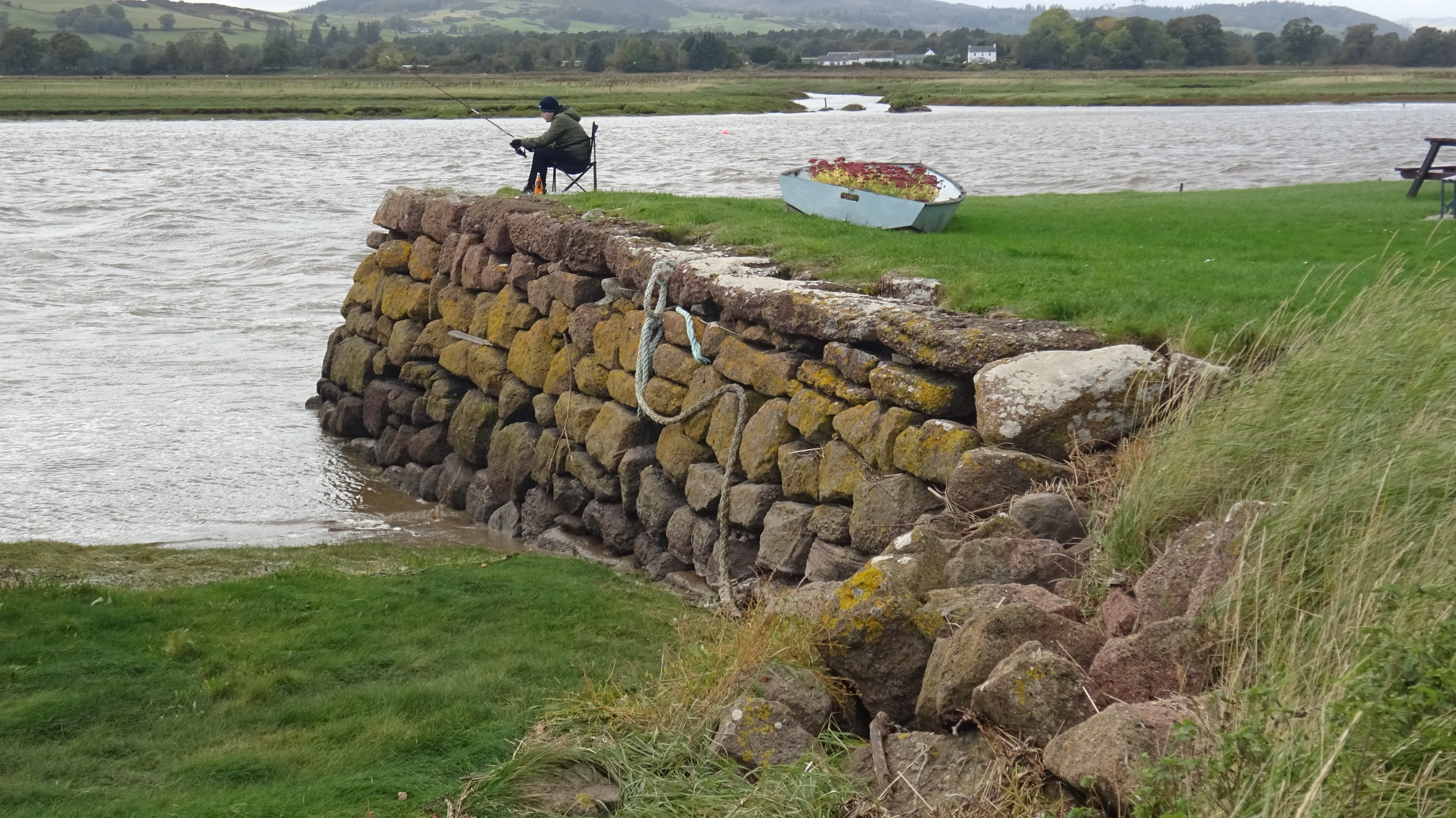
- Glencaple Quay

Location
- Location within Dumfries and Galloway
- Coordinates: 55.002724°N 3.574265°W

Glencaple Quay (NX994687) is located on the River Nith, it mainly served the town of Dumfries and to some degree the Glencaple area as well as its hinterland in Dumfries and Galloway. The quays at Dumfries, Kingholm Quay Laghall, Kelton and Castledykes lay upstream and downstream jetties were located at Kirkconnell and Carsethorn. It lies opposite Kirkconnell Merse.

== Location and purpose ==
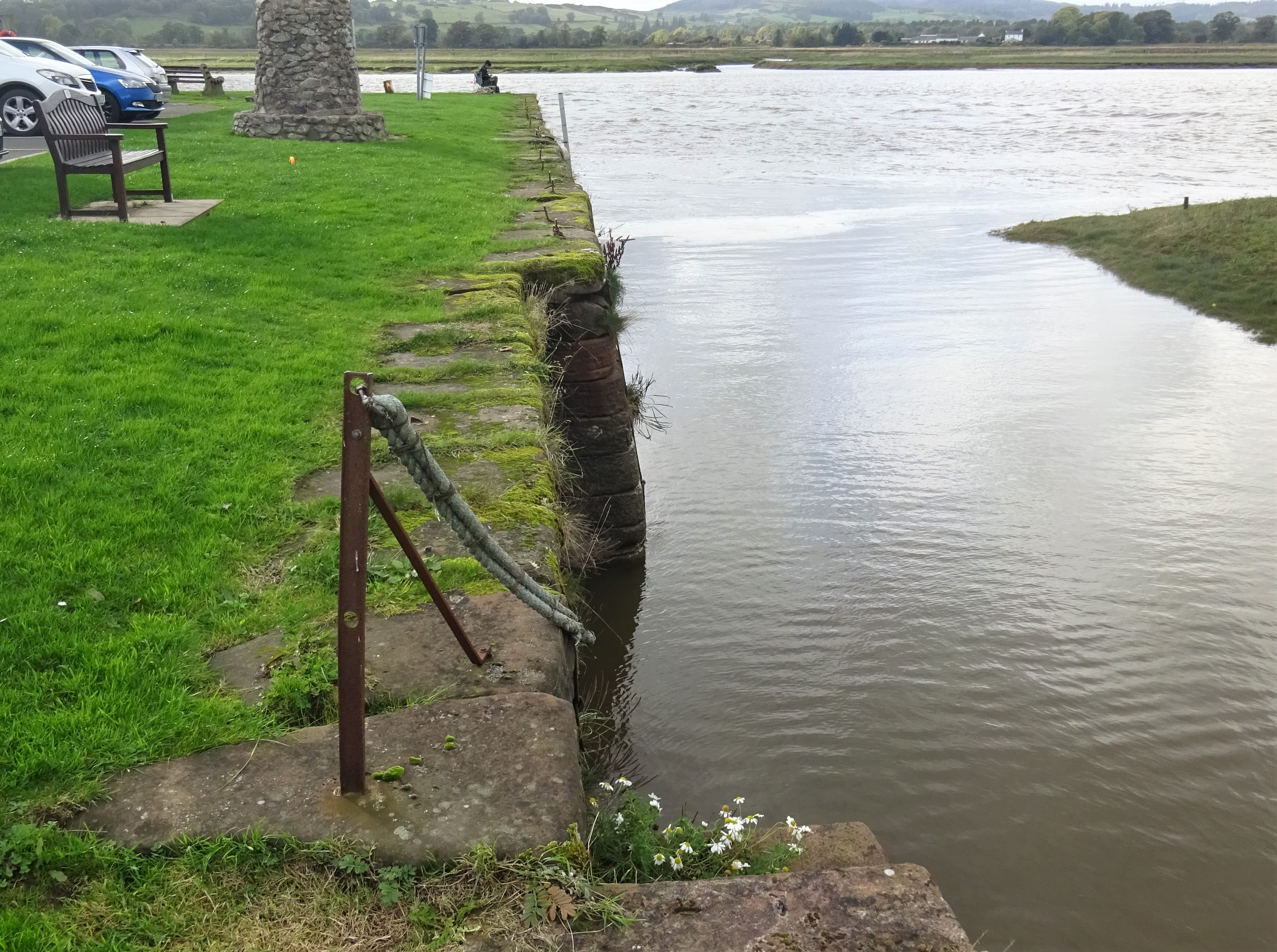
North quay and steps.

The quay lies on the east bank of the River Nith and is a stone built and approximately rectangular structure with two main quays and evidence of different building phases, being constructed in 1746 and rebuilt in 1836/40. The quay latterly had two warehouses, one small and the other somewhat larger.

Glencaple was enlarged in the 19th century to become a subsidiary port to that of Dumfries for the use of vessels that were unable to reach the burgh due to their size and draught. Larger ships were able to unload their cargoes here and local carriers were employed to transport the items by cart, via the shore side road to Dumfries. The River Nith was only fully navigable for vessels of from 60 to 70 tons, however ships of 300 tons could sail up as far as Glencaple. The Solway Firth proper starts about 1.5 miles or 2.4 kilometres below Glencaple Quay and at this point the Nith frequently shifts its channel.

The larger sailing vessels would lay up at Glencaple over the stormy winter months. The stone quay itself has sets of iron mooring bollards and wood moorings were located along the shingle and mud bank downstream showing that boats could safely lie up there as well. A set of stone steps on the north side lead down to the quay base.

It is not clear to what extent if any Glencaple was a base for trawlers, etc. Photographic evidence for the 1970s shows trawlers either laying up or actively using the quay.

=== Shipbuilding ===
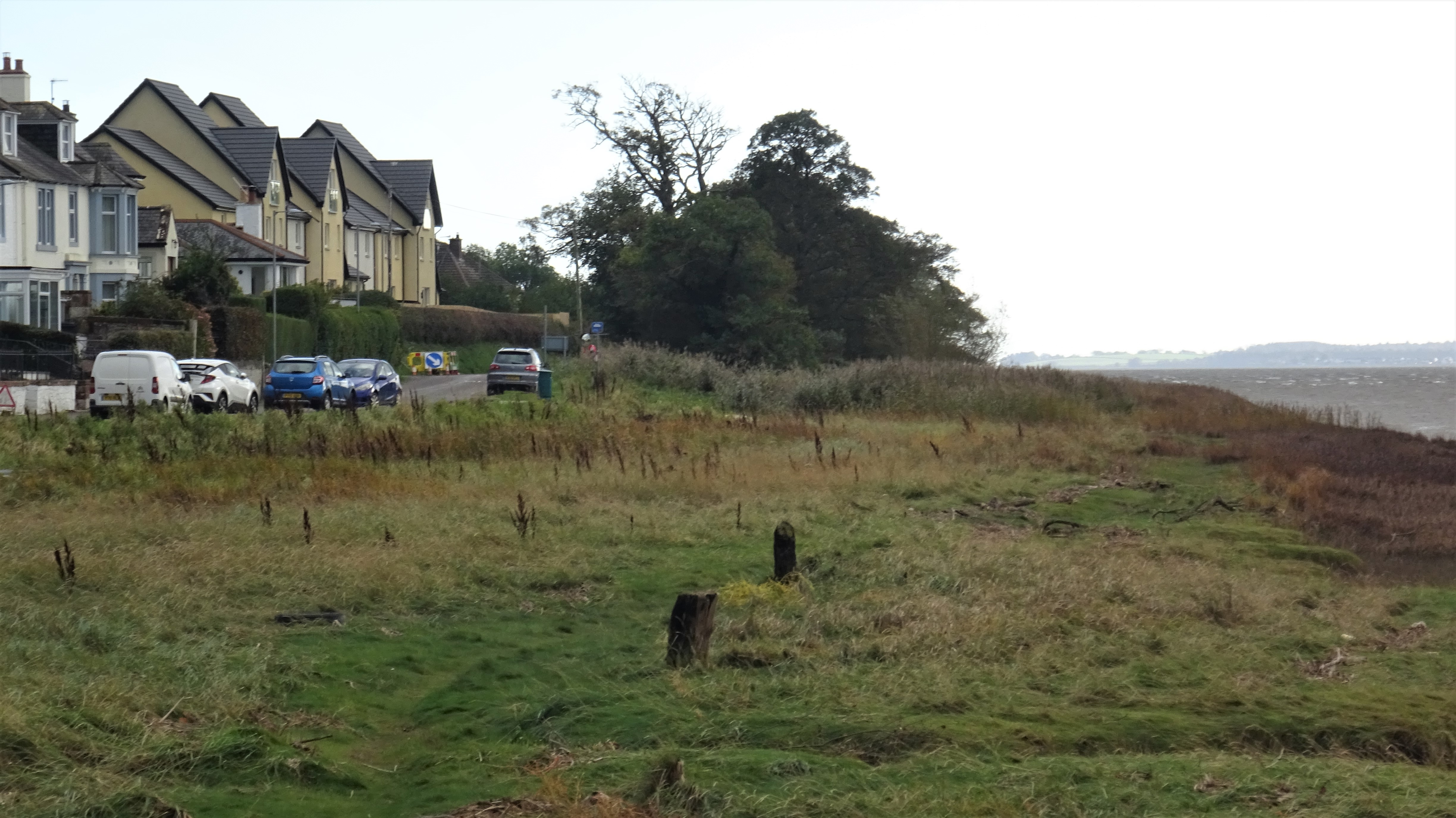
Site of slipway and old wood mooring bollards.

Glencaple had a Shipbuilding yard where usually a couple of vessels were launched each year. The yard was owned by Messrs. Thomson and was one of the largest in the area with around fifty tradesmen and apprentices, including rope makers, sail makers, carpenters, sail cloth weavers, cabinet makers, etc., employed here in building schooners and also to carry out repairs and maintenance on ships. All the ships built here between 1806 and 1858 are listed on one of the oak benches near the old shipyard site. The slip way lay on the south side of the quay with the yard across the road to the east.

== History ==
William Maxwell, Earl of Nithsdale in 1746 gave land at Glencaple for the quay, built with stone from his Bankend quarries to the Dumfries Town Council, in return for which he had free passage for his goods and stock over the toll bridge at Dumfries. The name 'Glencaple' derived from the Gaelic for 'The Mare's Glen'. Warehouses were also built and Glencaple developed into a thriving port with ships sailing to America and the West Indies. The first quay was built in 1746 and later the harbour was re-built as part of the 1800s improvements to the Port of Dumfries.

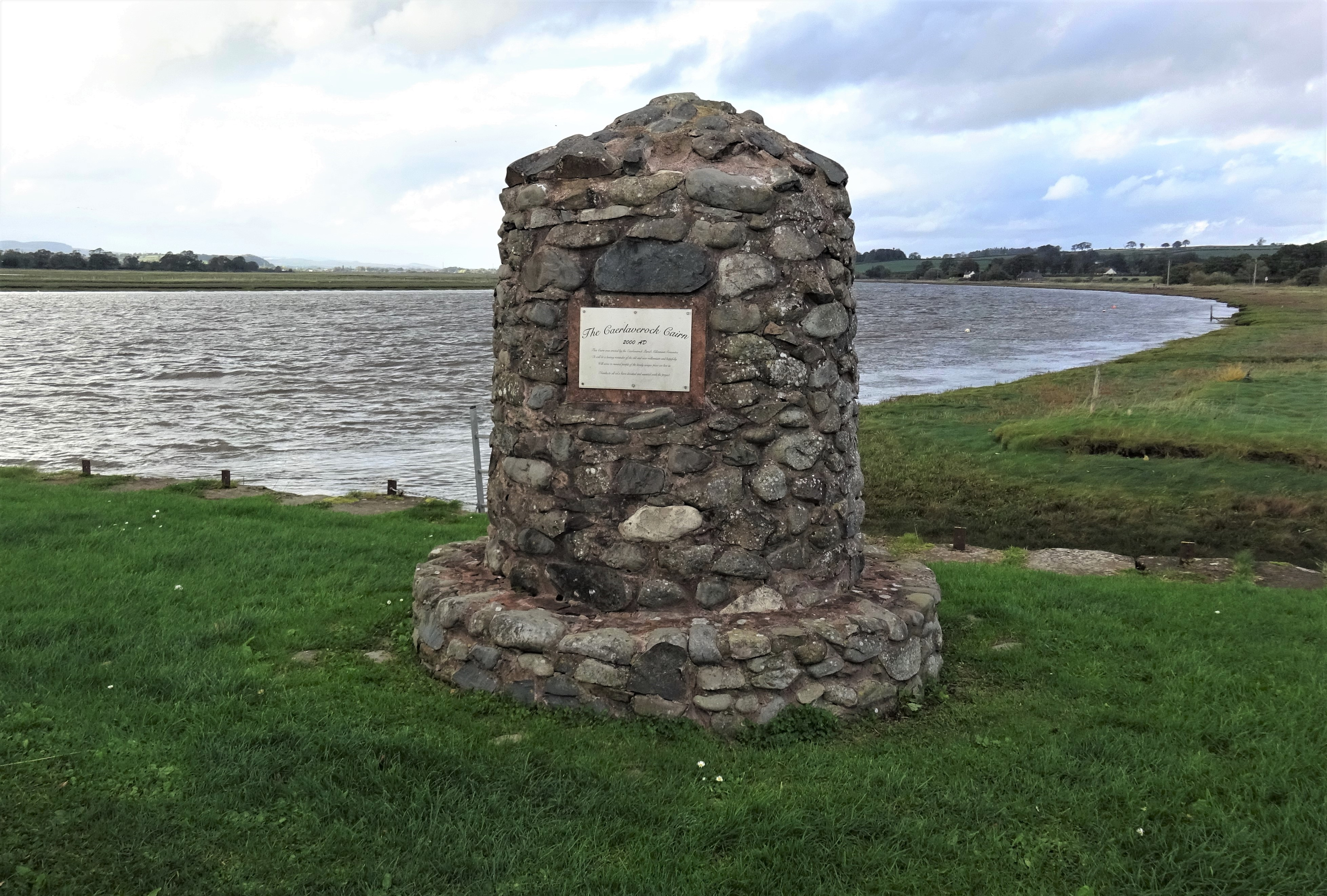
Millennium Cairn on the north quay.

The first ship to tie up at Glencaple Quay was the ‘Success’ with a cargo of American tobacco. Other items imports were timber from the Baltic, coal and lime from Cumberland, grocery items from Liverpool and rum, dried fruit and port wine from Spain. Animal bones, which were processed locally, such as at Kingholm Quay, to produce fertiliser. Later passenger ships and steamers ran regularly between Glencaple and Liverpool. The early 1800s saw a significant amount of emigration to the colonies from the area, especially to Canada. Newspapers at the time advertised ships sailing regularly from Glencaple and Carsethorn and these returned with cargoes of salted fish and timber. The quay still saw some traffic in 1976.

Farm produce was the main export, such as potatoes, with heavy taxes having to be paid on certain imported goods, which resulted in a very active smuggling trade and the poet Robert Burns who lived in Dumfries from 1791 to 1796, working as an Excise Officer or Gauger, may have visited Glencaple Quay on official business. Burns's friend and physician Dr William Maxwell had been brought up at Kirconnell House, on the west bank of the Nith, with its own private jetty.

A Small Schooner called the 'Clys' belonging to a Cumberland trader was wrecked and sank on the South Side of the Blackshaw Bank. Its South Mast remained above the Surface of the sand and it made a useful navigation point until all visible remains were removed by the tide and waves.

The shipping trade in the area declined rapidly throughout the late 19th century and WWI saw the port of Dumfries come to a virtual standstill and by WW2 only some older vessels were laying-up at Glencaple. Silting of the river, competition from the railway and the increase in use of larger ships that could not navigate the river were other contributory factors.

== The site today ==
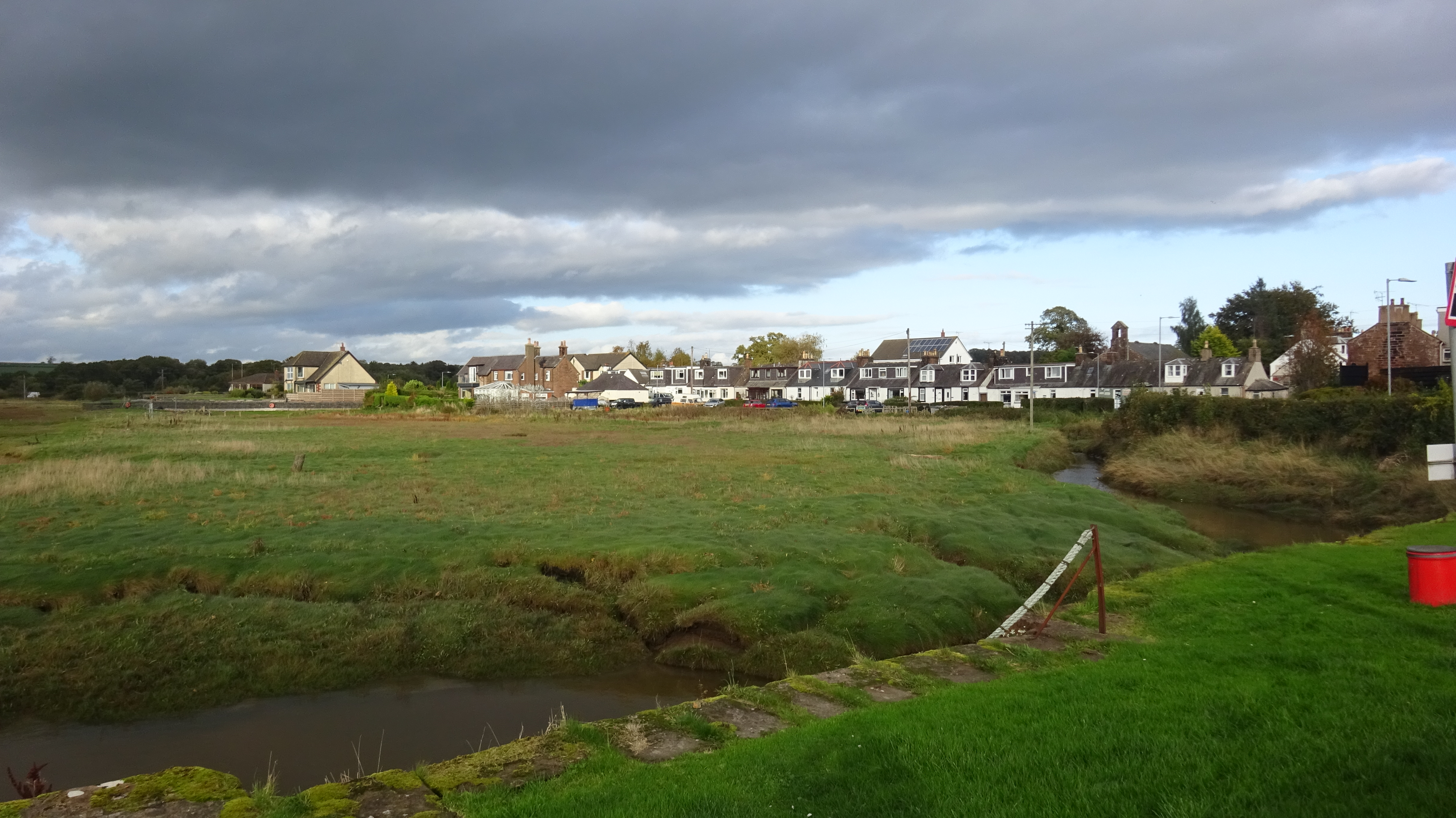
Glencaple from the quay.

It is not recorded when Glencaple was last used for import and export of goods, however as stated it saw some traffic as late as 1976. The two warehouses have been demolished and a large restaurant and shop stand on the site (datum 2022). A wood and iron brazier has been built at the end of the quay. A Millennium Cairn was placed on the quay for the Caerlaverock Parish. Car and motorhomes parking is provided with public toilets and information boards.

== The Nith Bore ==
The River Nith is one of only 15 or so rivers in the UK that exhibit tidal surge or aegir, better known as a tidal bore. The incoming tide is forced by the shape of the land to form a wave of water that travels against the current up this funnel-shaped river. The surging water can often be heard before it is seen. The shallow Nith flows into the wide, flat Solway estuary and when conditions are right, as with high spring tides and with favourable winds, the 'Bore' is created, scouring the river banks in its progress inland and potentially interfering with boats on the river and those that were moored at the time.
