= Glencaple =

Coordinates: 55°00′11″N 3°34′22″W

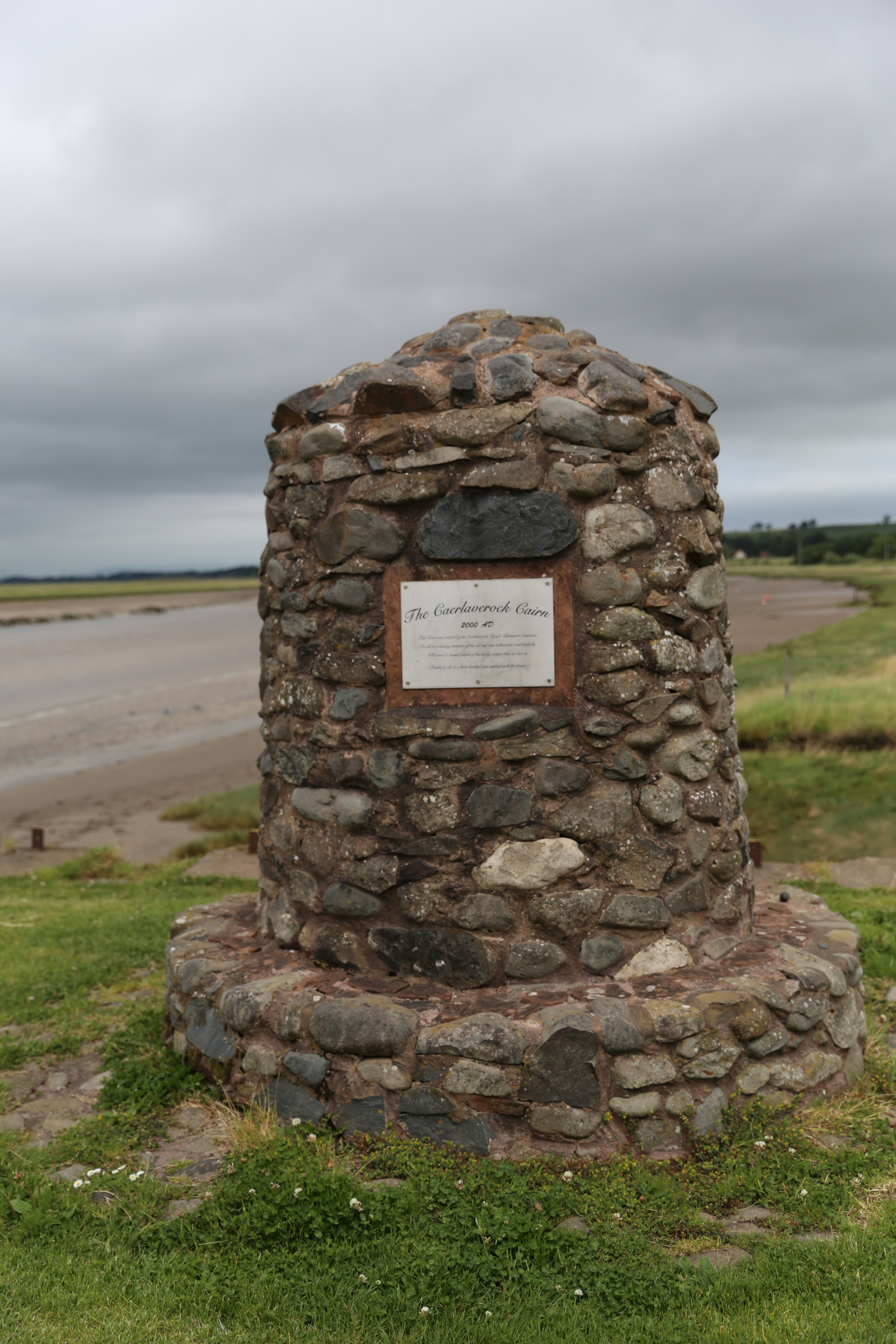
- Stone cairn in Glencaple, installed in celebration of the year 2000

- Location within Dumfries and Galloway
- OS grid reference: NX996687
- Council area: Dumfries and Galloway
- Lieutenancy area: Dumfriesshire
- Country: Scotland
- Sovereign state: United Kingdom
- Post town: DUMFRIES
- Postcode district: DG1
- Police: Scotland
- Fire: Scottish
- Ambulance: Scottish
- UK Parliament: Dumfriesshire, Clydesdale and Tweeddale
- Scottish Parliament: Dumfriesshire

Glencaple is a small settlement in the Dumfries and Galloway area of SW Scotland. Situated on the banks of the River Nith, it once served as a port for nearby Dumfries. Glencaple is a Gaelic name meaning 'horse valley' from the words gleann 'narrow valley' and capall 'horse, mare'.

== In the village ==
At the centre of the village is the old quay with The Boathouse (modern eatery and shop), 24-hour public toilets and Public Access Defibrillator (old phone box). Across the road overlooking the quay is the historic Nith Hotel (meals and accommodation). Turn left from the quay, cross the bridge over the burn and you come to Vintage on the Nith (antique shop). Continue along the road and at the very end of the village is Nith Inshore Rescue, our independent (non-RNLI) lifeboat. A part-time Post Office operates twice a week from the Barbour Hall in Church Street. The village has a Primary School and, opposite the school, an allotment site established in April 2020. New housing is being built at the southern end of the village (2021 onwards).

== Local Community ==
Caerlaverock Estate has been in the same family for 800 years. The Caerlaverock Estate website has information on places to stay, the estate farm and much more. The Caerlaverock Community Association website has a wealth of up-to-date information about history, people and events, including the monthly Scottish Women's Institute meetings in Glencaple.

== The Natural World ==
Tidal Bore

If conditions are right, a bore can sometimes be seen sweeping up the river as high tide approaches.

Wildlife

The area's bird life is one of the reasons people visit Glencaple. The mud exposed at low tide attracts large numbers of wildfowl and waders in autumn and winter. The merse (saltmarsh) across the river is home to Barnacle Geese in winter and breeding waders and skylarks in summer.

Protected Areas

Caerlaverock National Nature Reserve starts just to the south of the village. Glencaple lies within the Solway Firth SPA (Special Protection Area - designated Dec 2020), the Solway Firth SAC (Special Area of Conservation) and the Nith Estuary National Scenic Area. The Wildfowl and Wetlands Trust's WWT Caerlaverock reserve is 4 miles to the south.

Walking

Tracks lead along the merse to the north and south of the village but check the tides first. Up Church Street and on up the Quay Hill waymarked paths leave the road to left and right.

== Other places of interest ==
Caerlaverock Castle

== Opening of The Boathouse, 2012 ==
On 7 September 2012, Princess Alexandra opened the Caerlaverock Shop and Tearoom in Glencaple, accompanied by the Lord-Lieutenant of Dumfries, Jean Tulloch. The tearoom was originally operated by Lady Mary Mumford, a former lady-in-waiting to Princess Alexandra, and her sister, Baroness Herries. It is now overseen by Lady Clare Kerr, Lady Mary's niece.
