= Connel Burn =

River in East Ayrshire, Scotland

Coordinates: 55°24′N 4°12′W

Connel Burn Forest Area Entrance in Connel Park

Connel Burn is a river in East Ayrshire, Scotland, which rises at Enoch Hill in the Southern Uplands and flows northwards through Laglaf and Connel Park before meeting the River Nith in New Cumnock.
