= Laghall Quay =

Quay in Dumfries and Galloway, Scotland

- Dumfries, Scotland; GB grid reference NX438547
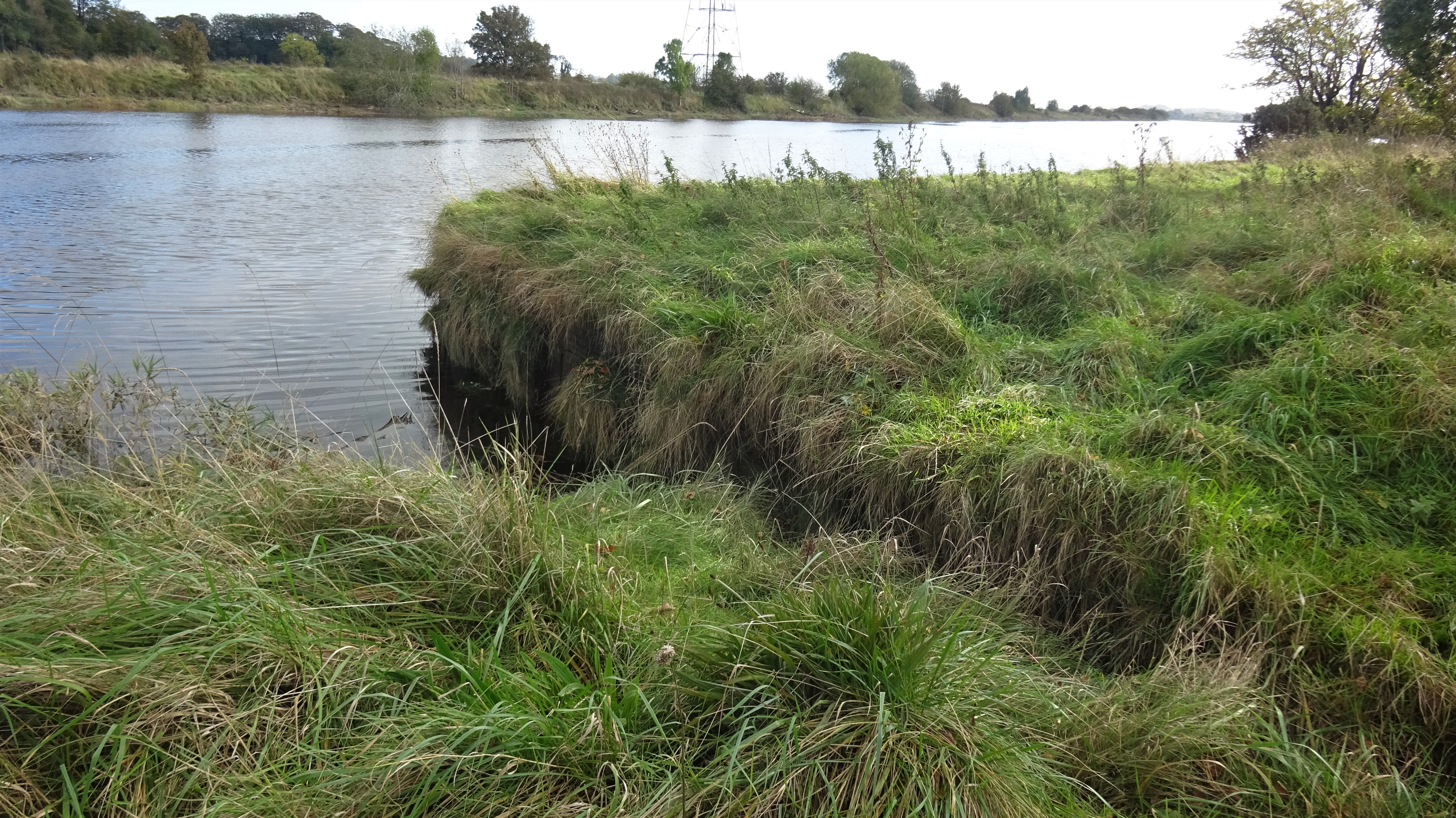
- Laghall Quay

Location
- Location within Dumfries and Galloway
- Coordinates: 55.043308°N 3.6079775°W

Laghall Quay (NX973732) is located on the River Nith, once serving the estate of Laghall, later named Mavis Grove and now again called Laghall as well as its hinterland in Dumfries and Galloway, previously Kirkcudbrightshire. The ports of Dumfries, Kingholm Quay and Castledykes Quay lay upstream and downstream quays or harbours were located at Kelton, Glencaple, Carsethorn and Kirkconnell Jetty. It lies on the edge of the old Mavisgrove Merse.

== Infrastructure ==
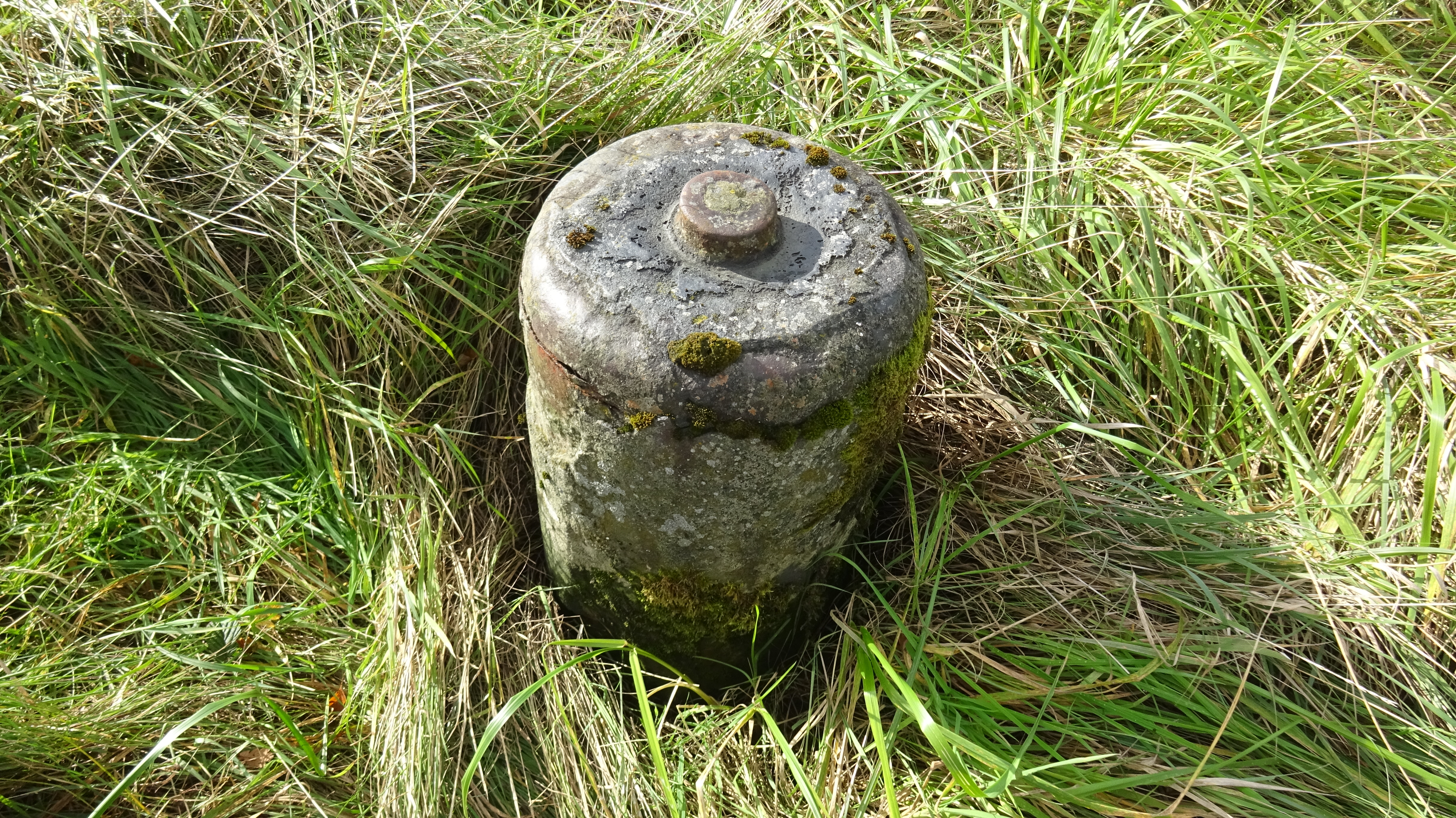
Old cannon used as a mooring bollard.

The quay lies on the west bank of the River Nith and has a single L-shaped stone built quay. In 1848/58 it was described as a small, but safe harbour with mooring-place for two vessels of about 50 or 60 tons, and imports were mainly coal and timber, whilst the nearby Kingholm Quay had mooring places for about twelve vessels of about 60 or 80 tons and imported coal, bones, Guano, timber, etc. and exported various kinds of farming produce. Available maps do not indicate any buildings on the quay or nearby and no foundations or ruins are present. Some of the moorings are made of granite, but a few are old iron cannon, set muzzle downwards into the ground. Local knowledge indicates that these were made locally for use in the Crimean War and were flawed castings, so they were utilised as mooring bollards.

== History ==
The name of the quay and the original name of the estate was 'Laghall,' which may derive from the Scots word 'Lag' meaning a place where boats are pulled up. The estate was named 'Mavis Grove' at the time of Colonel De Peyster and later reverted to 'Laghall' as it is known today (datum 2022).

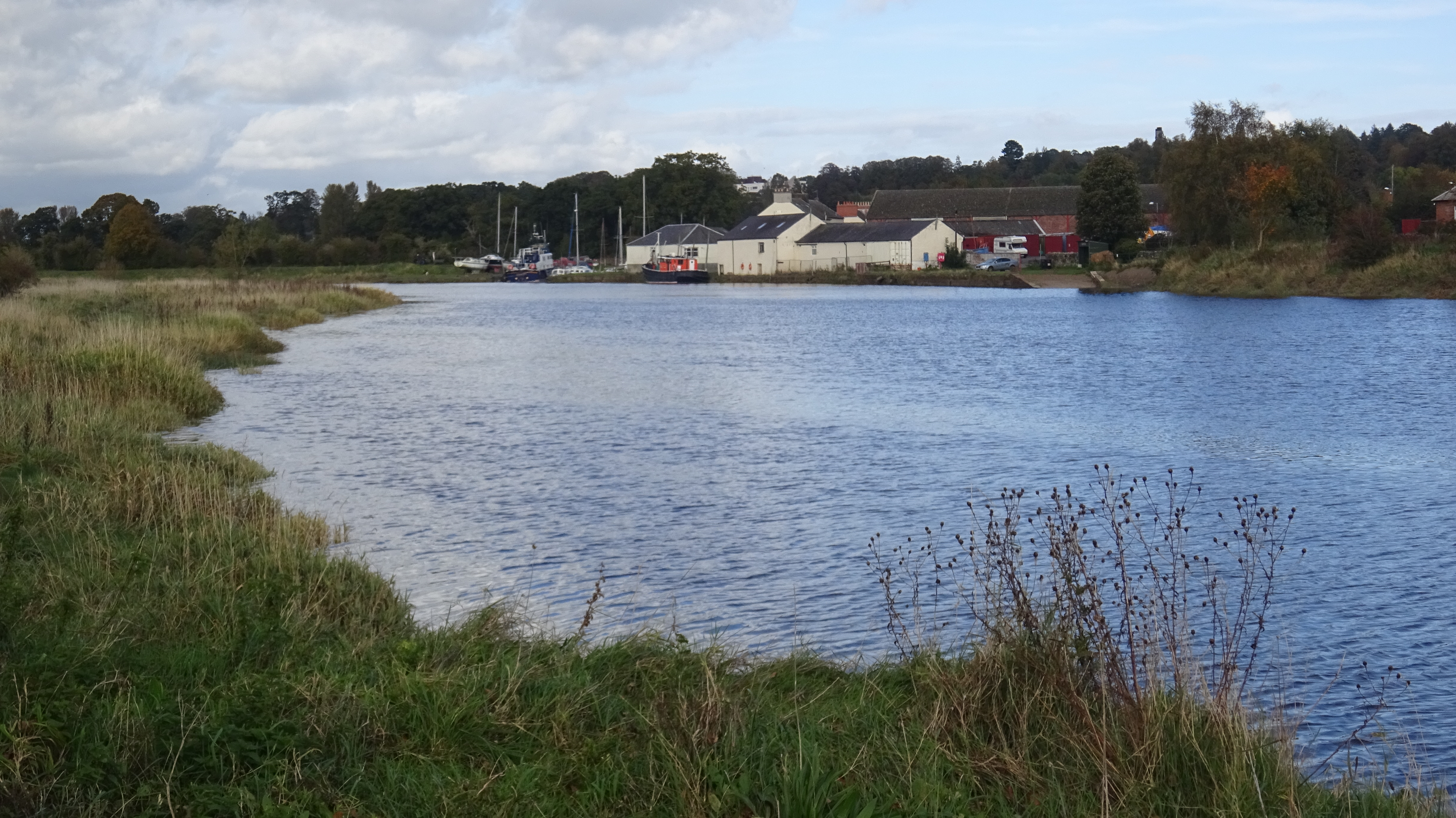
Kingholm Quay from Laghall Quay

Records of the site as a place where boats could lay up on the shingle and mud banks go back as far as 1694; in 1812 no quay is recorded, however in 1825 the construction of a stone quay at Laghall was completed. The remnants of older quays are apparent a short distance downstream. Two granite moorings bollards are located on the quay itself and one on the shingle bank is made from an old iron cannon, set muzzle downwards into the ground. Local knowledge at Kingholm Quay indicates that these were made locally for use in the Crimean War and any flawed castings were utilised as mooring bollards.

Pousance Island lay upstream of the quay. The name 'Pousance,' a variation on 'Puissance' in Anglo-Norman, means 'Power, might or Authority' and also occurs as a surname or a first name. The trading links with France may provide an explanation. The 'Pousance Island' is still shown on the map in 1845, but no vestige remains today (datum 2022).

The poet Robert Burns lived in Dumfries from 1791 to 1796, working as an Excise Officer or Gauger and may have visited Laghall Quay on official business as well as in his leisure time, as he often visited the then Mavis Grove estate, where his friend Colonel Arent De Peyster (1736–1822) lived. De Peyster became the major-commandant of the Dumfries Volunteers of which Burns was a member. Burns's friend and physician Dr William Maxwell had been brought up at Kirconnell House, also on the west bank of the Nith, with its own private jetty. John McMurdo, another friend of Robert Burns, lived at Mavis Grove towards the end of his life.

== Workings details ==
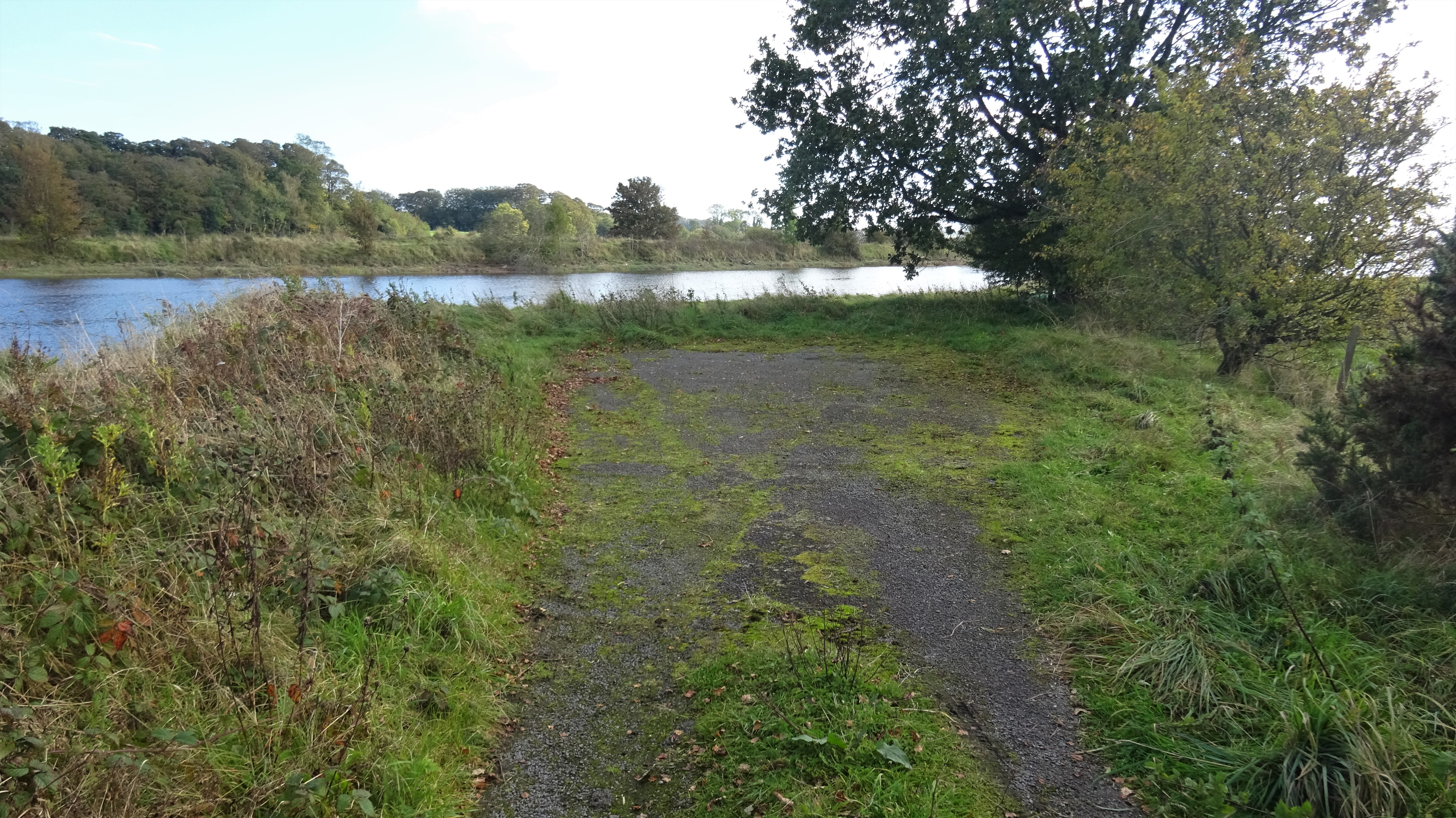
The quay and access lane end

At nearby Kingholm Quay the commerce involved the import of tobacco from the North American colonies and the importing of cargoes of lime and coal. Dried fruits, wines, brandy and luxury textiles were imported from Spain and France. The Spring Tide depth is shown as ten feet. The stone quay itself had two sets of moorings bollards, however more were located along the shingle and mud bank upstream showing that boats could safely lie up there as well. It is approached by a lane that branches off from the A710 road from Dumfries. It isn't clear whether Laghall was used by fishing boats at any stage.

== The site today ==
Considerable restoration and improvement works have been carried out at nearby Kingholm recently (datum 2022), but not at Laghall. The Port of Dumfries Development Group have construction of a slipway at Kingholm. The River Nith has recently been dredged recently. It is not recorded when Laghall was last used for imports and exports of goods, however the mooring bollard made from an old cannon has had cement applied to strengthen it.

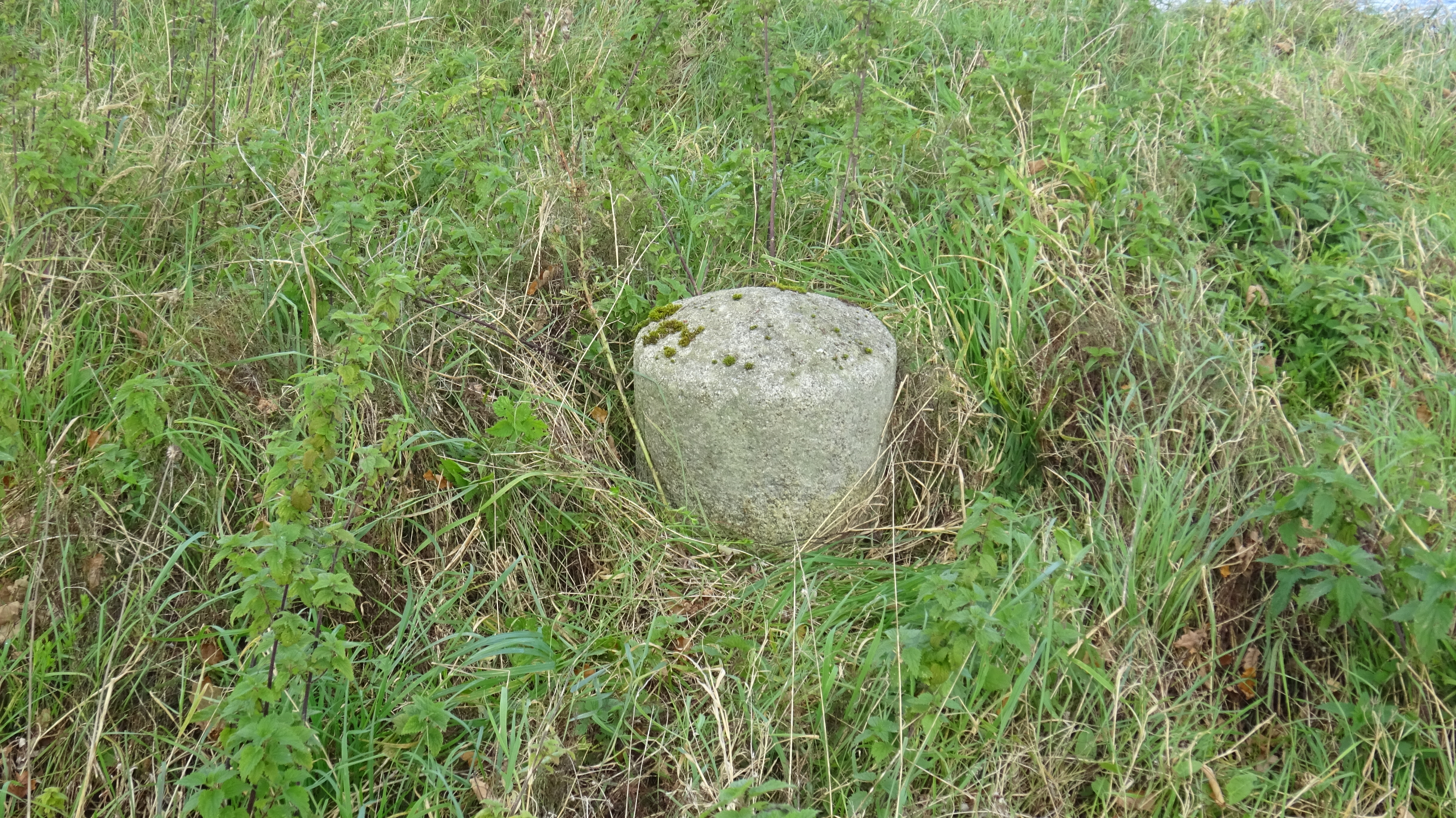
Old granite mooring bollard

== The Nith Bore ==
The River Nith is one of only 15 or so rivers in the UK that exhibit tidal surge or aegir, better known as a tidal Bore. The incoming tide is forced by the shape of the land to form a wave of water that travels against the current up this funnel-shaped river. The surging water can often be heard before it is seen. The shallow Nith flows into the wide, flat Solway estuary and when conditions are right, as with high spring tides and with favourable winds, the 'Bore' is created, scouring the river banks in its progress inland and potentially interfering with boats on the river and those that were moored at the time.
