= River Nith =

River in south-west Scotland

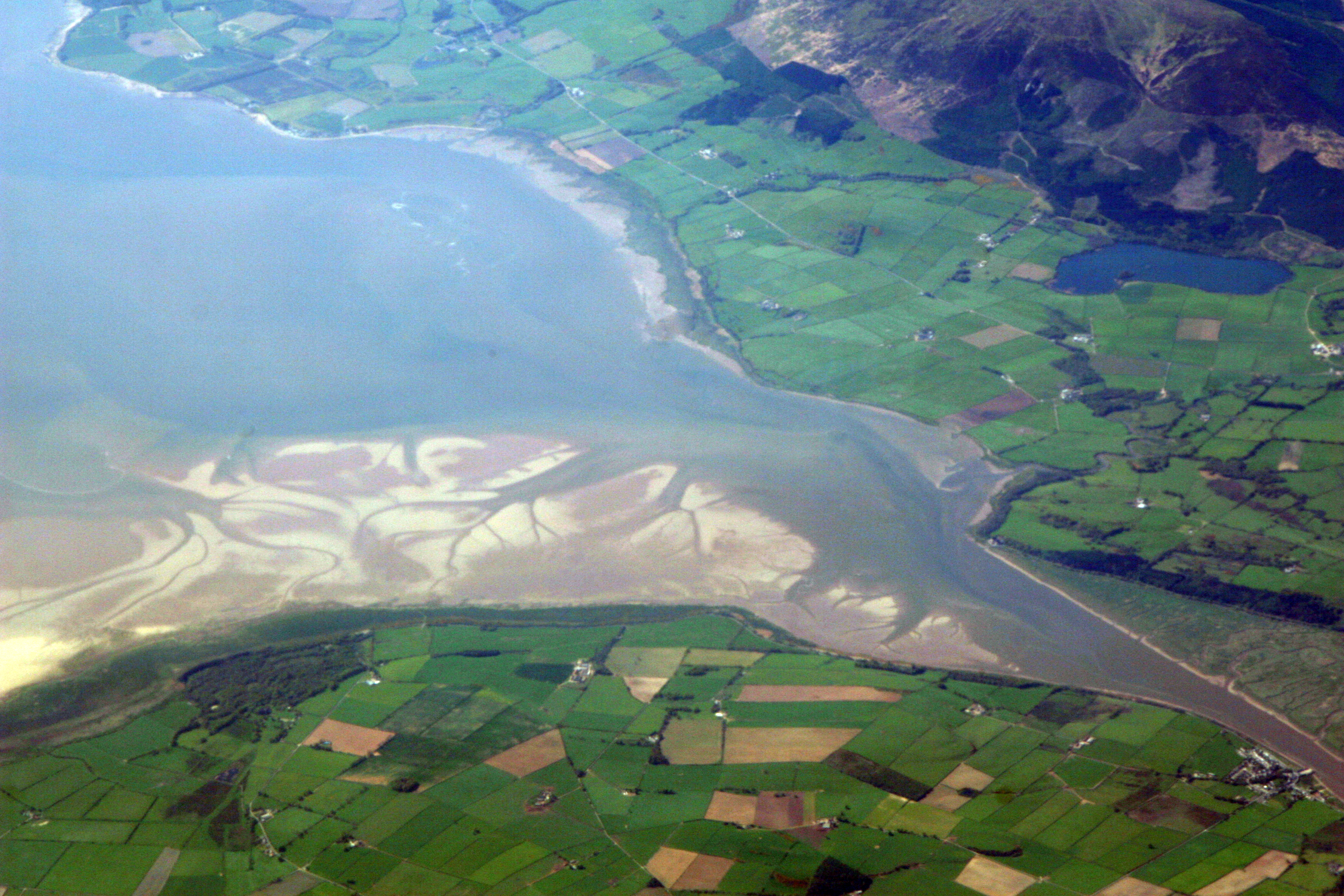
- The estuary of the River Nith, opening into Solway Firth south of Dumfries

Location
- Country: Scotland

Physical characteristics
- Source
  - location: Enoch Hill
  - coordinates: 55.328°N 4.284°W
- Mouth
  - location: Solway Firth
- Length: 70 mi (110 km)
- Basin size: 1,230 km^{2} (470 sq mi)

The River Nith (Scottish Gaelic: Abhainn Nid; Common Brittonic: Nowios) is a river in south-west Scotland. The Nith rises in the Carsphairn hills of East Ayrshire, between Prickeny Hill and Enoch Hill, 4.4 miles (7.1 km) east of Dalmellington. For the majority of its 70 miles (110 km) course it flows in a south-easterly direction through Dumfries and Galloway and then into the Solway Firth at Airds Point.

The territory through which the river flows is called Nithsdale (historically known as "Stranit" from Scottish Gaelic: Strath Nid, 'valley of the Nith').

== Length ==
For estuaries the principle followed is that the river should be visible at all times. The measurement therefore follows the centre of the river at low tide and the mouth of the river is assumed to be at the coastal high tide mark. In Scotland this does not generally make a significant difference, except for rivers draining into shallow sloping sands of the Irish Sea and Solway Firth, notably the Nith. At low tide, the sea recedes to such an extent that the length of the Nith is extended by 13 km to 113.8 km (70.7 miles), making it Scotland's seventh longest river.

== Protected areas ==
The estuary of the River Nith is an internationally important winter feeding site for waders, geese and other wildfowl, and is for this reason protected at an international level as part of the Upper Solway Flats and Marshes Ramsar site and Special Protection Area. The SPA supports virtually the entire Svalbard population of barnacle geese during winter.

The area also forms part of the Solway Firth Special Area of Conservation, which is protected due to the presence of several priority habitats, and as well as populations of sea lamprey and river lamprey. At a national level, the area is a Site of Special Scientific Interest and is within the Caerlaverock National Nature Reserve.

The Nith Estuary National Scenic Area recognises the scenic value of the area. It is one of 40 such areas in Scotland, which are defined so as to identify areas of exceptional scenery and to ensure its protection from inappropriate development by restricting certain forms of development. The Nith Estuary NSA covers 14,337 ha in total, consisting of 14,310 ha of land and intertidal sand and mudflats, as well as a further 28 ha that is below low water. Management of the NSA is the responsibility of Dumfries and Galloway Council, who have produced a management strategy for the area.

== Tributaries ==
Upstream to downstream:

- Connel Burn
- Afton Water
- Kello Water
- Crawick Water
- Euchan Water
- Mennock Water
- Carron Water
- Cample Water
- Scar Water
- Shinnel Water
- Cluden Water
- Cargen Pow
- New Abbey Pow

== Settlements ==
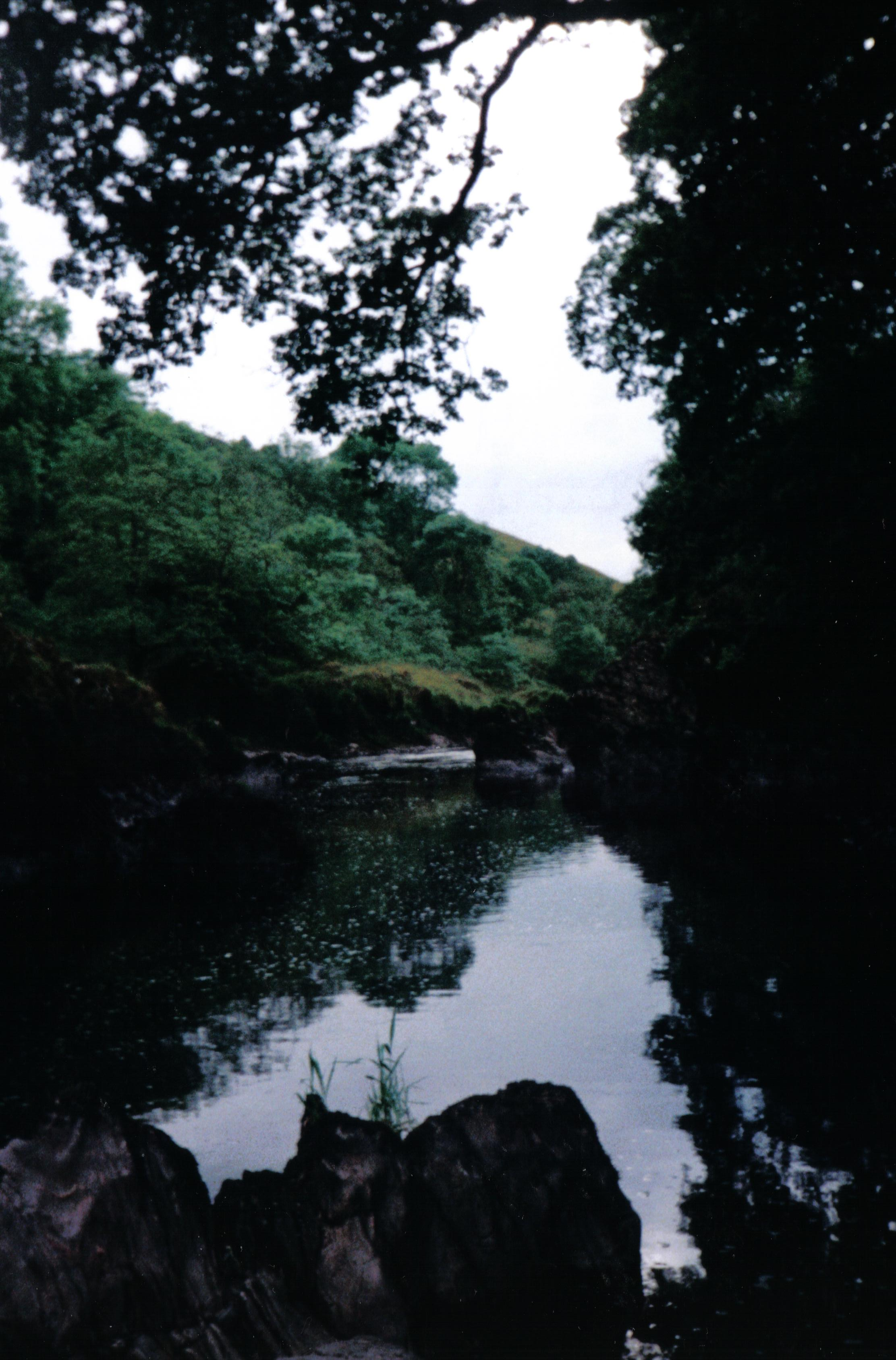
The Nith near Carron Bridge.

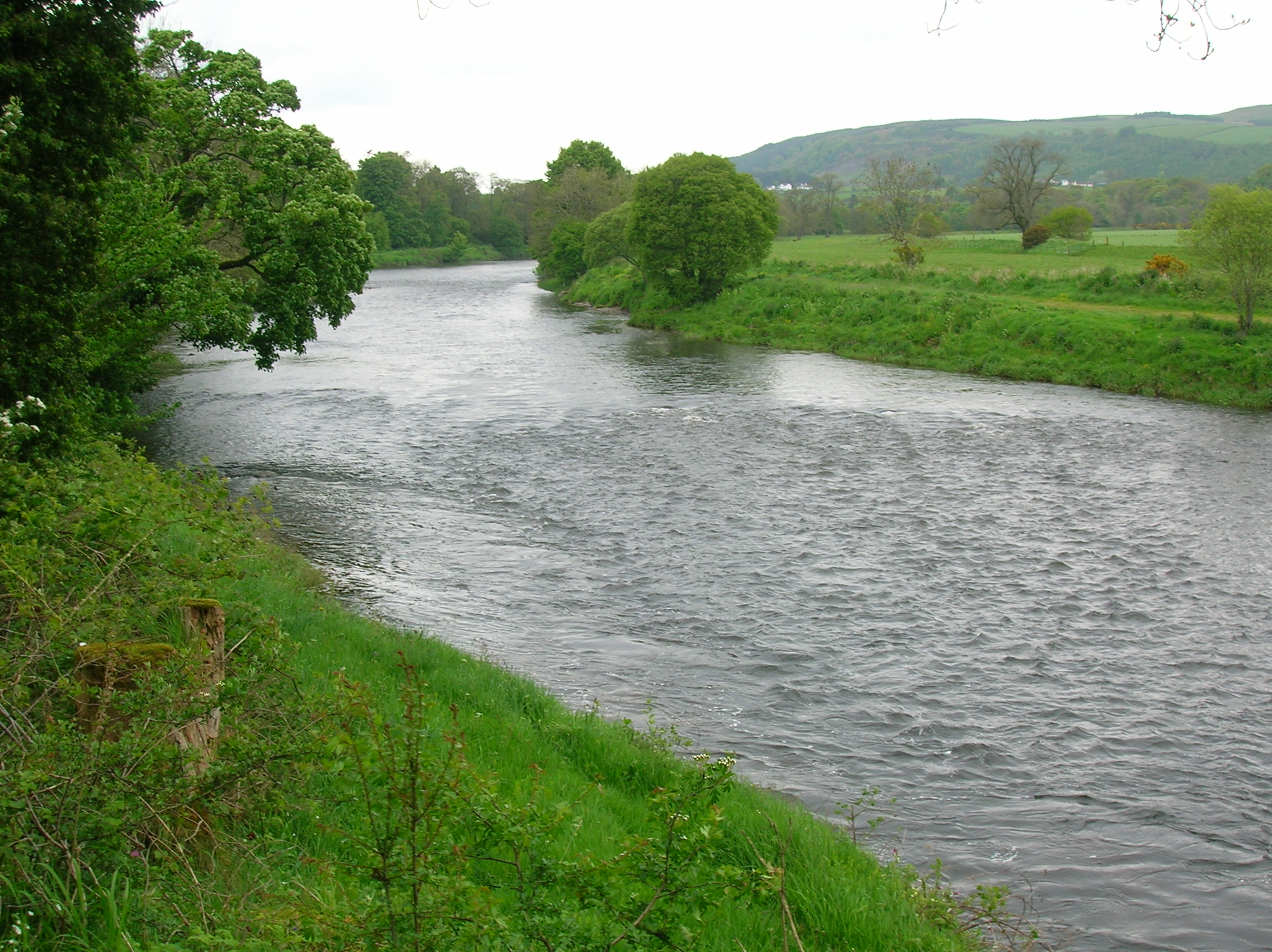
The Nith at Ellisland Farm.

- Carronbridge
- New Cumnock
- Kirkconnel
- Sanquhar
- Mennock
- Thornhill
- Dumfries
- Glencaple

== Harbours ==
- Glencaple Quay
- Kingholm Quay
- Laghall Quay

== See also ==
- Dalgarnock Village, Church and Parish
