= William Maxwell (doctor) =

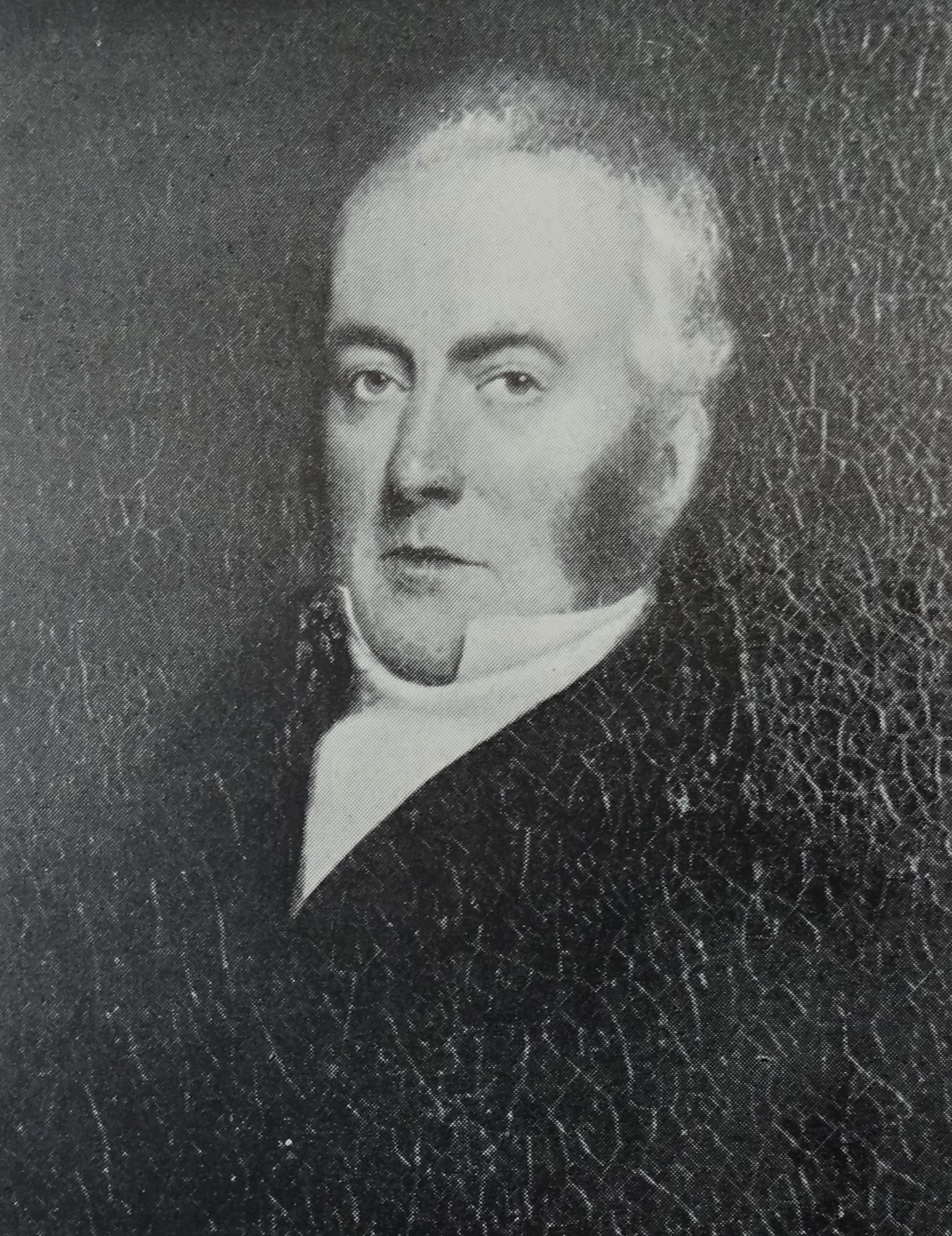
- Dr William Maxwell
- Born: 1760; Kirkconnell House, New Abbey.
- Died: 13 October 1834
- Occupation: Doctor of Medicine

William Maxwell (1769–1826) was a medical doctor who treated Robert Burns during his final illness. He was one of Robert Burns's intimate friends during his Nithsdale and Dumfries days, noted for his Jacobite links that struck a chord with the poet's own symapthies. His father, James Maxwell, took part in the 1745 uprising, and his grandfather, William, had fought in the 1715 uprising. Maxwell never married, but fathered a natural daughter, Elizabeth, who lived with him in Edinburgh.

== Life and character ==
Maxwell was the second son of James Maxwell of the Kirkconnell Estate near New Abbey, and his English mother was Mary Riddell of Swinburne, the marriage taking place in August 1758. Maxwell's family had been in the county since around 1430, however his father was exiled after his involvement in the 1745 uprising and only after the Craiks of Abigland interceded were the ancestral estates returned to the Maxwells in 1753. James Maxwell died in July 1762 when his son William was only two. William and his two brothers attended school at the Jesuit College at Dinant in Flanders in 1771, a popular destination for the children of Jacobite families. The Jesuits were suppressed by the Pope, however, and Dinant was forced to close in 1773, the brothers transferring to the 'Academie Anglaise' in Liege. William spent eight years on the Kirkconnell estate following his graduation from the academy. An unidentified illness restricted him for a couple of years. However, in 1784, he took up a place to study medicine at the University of Edinburgh and after three years of study, he graduated as a doctor.

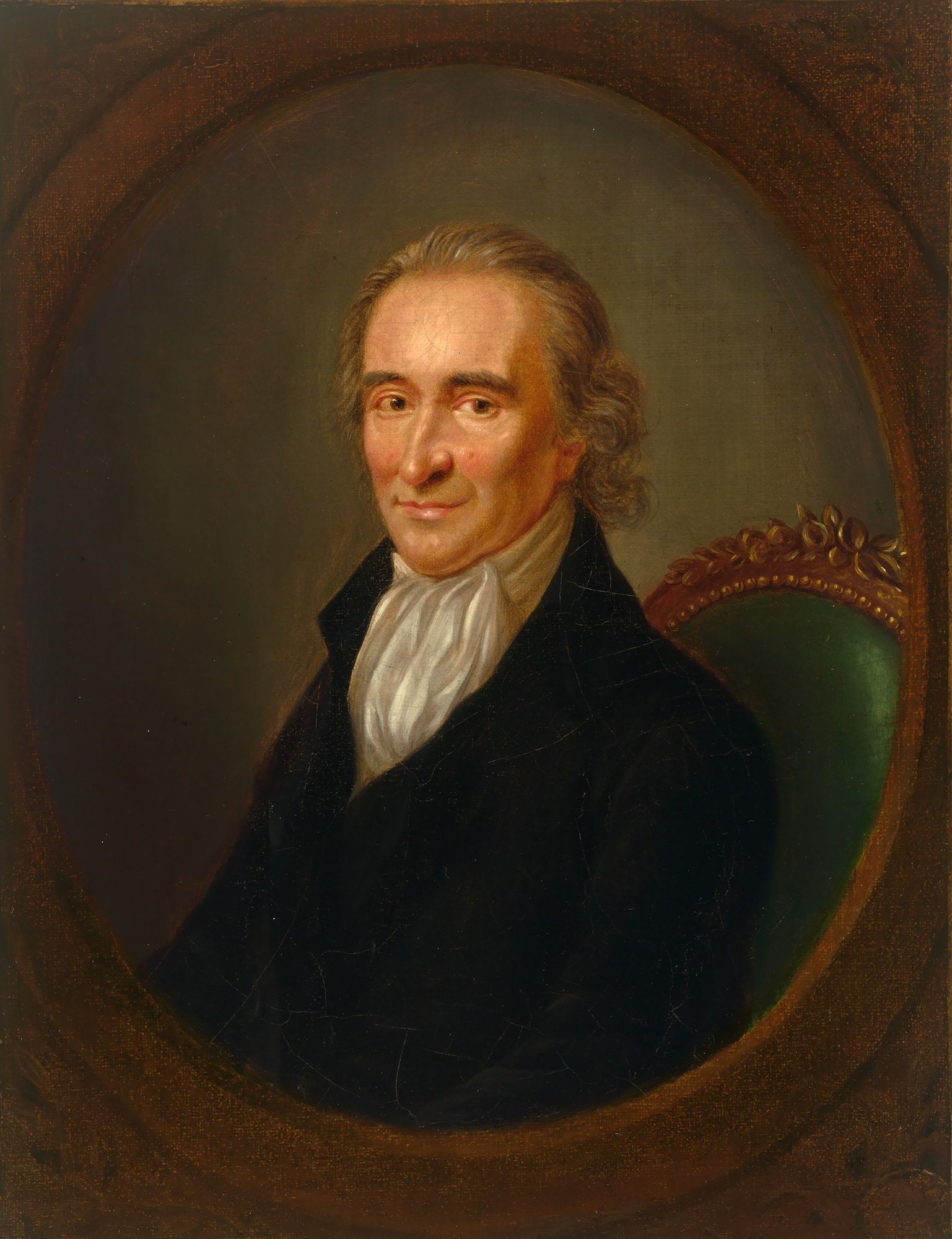
Thomas Paine

Whilst living in Edinburgh he became aware of and adopted the ideals of the new enlightenment then sweeping through Europe. Maxwell made some efforts to practice in Dumfries and then London, however he instead departed to undertake the European 'Grand Tour' but found himself in Paris nearing the pivotal moment of the establishment of the republic and became friends with some of the leaders of the revolutionary movement. In 1789 Maxwell returned to London to placate his family. However, upon inheriting £500, he returned to France from London, abandoning again his attempts to set up a medical practice in the capital.

In France he was enlisted to acquire weapons for the revolutionaries and travelling to Birmingham he ordered two or three thousand daggers at a Guinea a dozen, but upon hearing that his name and Jacobin tendencies had been raised in the House of Commons by Edmund Burke, he found himself the centre of much undesirable attention, left London and returned to be welcomed by his now powerful friends in France. He knew Thomas Paine and had also helped form the radical London Corresponding Society in 1792 and had even advertised a meeting for sympathisers to attend at Great Portland Street to donate funds to the cause. One loyalist newspaper branded him as Britain's most wanted, dangerous, Jacobin sympathiser.

After enlisting in the National Guard, he ultimately became a member of the elite troops guarding Louis XVI on his way to be guillotined. A belief that was associated with him all his life was that he had dipped his handkerchief in the executed king's blood. He is said to have been so close to the scaffold that he could see the face of the king and heard Abbe Edgeworth say to him Fils de Saint Louis, Montez au Ciel!

In February 1793, France declared war on Great Britain and Maxwell decided to support his home nation and returned to Britain. He was, however, detained and questioned for several hours at Dover before being permitted to land.

His fraught experiences in France taught him the folly of his idealistic beliefs and chastened, he spent some time with family in Aberdeenshire before setting about taking up a career in medicine again in 1794. His small practice in Dumfries saw some moderate success, but his family had to tolerate the celebrity status that his exploits had engendered. Eventually moving to Edinburgh, he fathered a natural daughter, Elizabeth, who lived with him. He died in 1834 and is thought to have been buried with his father in Sweetheart Abbey.

Maxwell's mother, Mary, purchased the 32-acre Troqueer Holm Estate on the west bank of the River Nith and lived here with her son until her death in 1805. William himself remained here until 1808.

== Association with Robert Burns ==
He met Burns in Dumfries where he was viewed with some suspicion by the authorities because of his Jacobin associations, but his skills as a doctor mostly overcame these difficulties amongst the populace, but less so with the aristocracy. Like Burns, he was attacked in print by a member of the 'Loyal Natives' a right-wing group.

Ye Sons of Perdition

Ye sons of sedition, give ear to my song,
Let Syme, Burns and Maxwell pervade every throng,
With Cracken the attorney, and Mundell the quack
Send Willie the monger to hell with a smack.

Burns responded in kind:

Burns's response

Ye true 'Loyal natives', attend to my song,
In uproar and riot rejoice the night long:
From envy and hatred your corps is exempt
But where is your shield from the darts of contempt?

Burns wrote a verse to Maxwell regarding an incident where he had saved the life of Jessie Staig, the 16-year-old daughter of the provost of Dumfries, who he had already immortalised in his song "Lovely Young Jessie". Dr Mundell had been treating her and had given her only hours to live before Maxwell took on the case and she recovered.

Jessie Staig

Maxwell if merit here you crave,
That merit I deny:
You save fair Jessie from the grave!
An angel could not die

Mrs Frances Dunlop of Dunlop

Burns wrote to Frances Dunlop saying of Maxwell that "Maxwell is my most intimate friend, & one of the first (finest) characters I ever met; but on account of his politics is rather shunned by some high Aristocrates, though his Family & Fortune entitled him to the first circles." Reminding Frances that he was the same "Dr Maxwell whom (Edmund) Burke mentioned in the House of Commons about the affair of the daggers." Mrs Dunlop replied that Burns's muse was stained by an association with Dr Maxwell, stained with the blood of the guillotine. Burke later met Maxwell and declared that he was not the bloodthirsty Jacobin that his reputation implied.

Maxwell gave Burns a dirk that he had obtained for an "anker of Ferintosh' (a measure of whisky) that had belonged to Lord Balmerino and later Burns gifted this to the Birmingham gunsmith David Blair, who had gifted him a fine pair of pistols in 1788. These are the same pistols that Burns later gave to Maxwell.

For reasons unknown, Maxwell failed to rally to Burns's support in regard to George Thomson's negative unsigned obituary that had appeared in the Glasgow Mercury and the Edinburgh Evening Courant.

Maxwell corresponded with Gilbert Burns over the letters held by Frances Dunlop and on various matters with Robert Burns Junior.

Maxwell and Syme were the only two people who were in a position to read, the later destroyed correspondence between Clarinda and Burns, whilst going through the letters in Burns' possession at the time of his death, only commenting that "the person, if alive, must have an anxious, distracted heart" and had "felt the genuine passion of love".

=== Burns illness and death ===
Taking over from Dr James Mundell as the family physician in 1794, Maxwell attended Burns during his last illness, diagnosing what were probably the stabbing pains of endocarditis or 'flying gout,' a form of rheumatism, and prescribed "sea-bathing in country quarters and horseriding"; 'cures' which were far from effective and are likely to have hastened his death. In July 1796, Burns rode the ten miles to the hamlet of Brow where he spent nearly three weeks drinking from the chalybeate well and bathing in the waters of the Solway Firth. Upon his return to Dumfries, John Syme visited him and was shocked by his condition, writing to Alexander Cunningham that "Dr Maxwell told me yesterday he had no hopes."

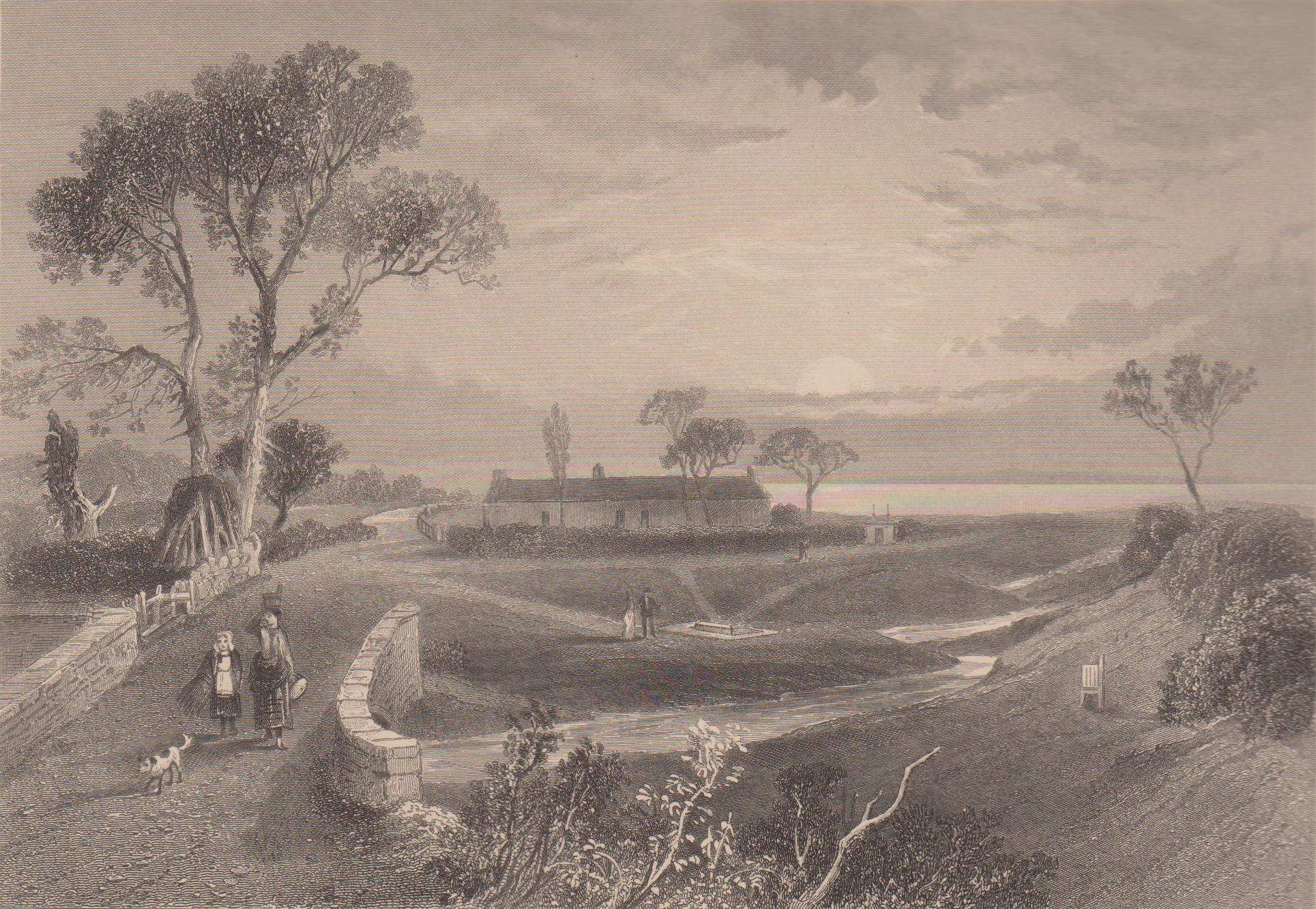
Brow Village and the Chalybeate Well

Shortly before his death, the poet presented Maxwell, as previously stated, with his pair of Excise pistols that had been gifted to him by David Blair the gunsmith. They passed to Bishop Gillis and are now preserved in the Royal Museum of Scotland. Supposedly saying to Maxwell "Alas! What has brought you here? I am but a poor crow, and not worth plucking." Another version was "What business has a physician to waste his time on me? I am a poor pigeon not worth plucking. Alas! I have not feathers enough upon me to carry me to my grave."

Jean Armour named their last son, Maxwell Burns, in his honour, he had actually delivered the baby. Jean was unaware that Burns had intended to name him Alexander Cunningham Burns, after another good friend.

Following Robert Burns's death, Maxwell and John Syme organised his funeral and then together with Alexander Cunningham became trustees who collected money for a fund to ensure that Burns's widow and children were adequately supported. They had already called a fund-raising meeting at the Dumfries Club two days before Burns' death.

== See also ==
- Jean Armour
- Jessie Lewars
