= List of listed buildings in Sanquhar, Dumfries and Galloway =

This is a list of listed buildings in the civil parish of Sanquhar in Dumfries and Galloway, Scotland.

== List ==
Name	Location	Date Listed	Grid Ref. (Note: Sometimes known as OSGB36, the grid reference (where provided) is based on the British national grid reference system used by the Ordnance Survey. • "Guide to National Grid". Ordnance Survey. • "Get-a-map". Ordnance Survey.)	Geo-coordinates	Notes	LB Number (Note: Historic Environment Scotland assign a unique alphanumeric identifier to each designated site in Scotland, for listed buildings this always begins with "LB", for example "LB12345".)	Image
High Street, Tolbooth / Town House				55°22′05″N 3°55′30″W	Category A	40540	Upload another image
5, 7 High Street, Including Mary Millar's Shop				55°22′05″N 3°55′29″W	Category C(S)	40542	Upload Photo
39, 41 High Street, Post Office And House				55°22′04″N 3°55′24″W	Category B	40547	Upload Photo
14-24 High Street (Even Nos)				55°22′04″N 3°55′28″W	Category C(S)	40553	Upload Photo
104-106 High Street, Library And House				55°22′00″N 3°55′17″W	Category C(S)	40560	Upload Photo
Laurie's Wynd, Crichton Schoolhouse				55°22′06″N 3°55′18″W	Category B	40562	Upload Photo
Sanquar House (Parish Manse) And Walled Garden				55°22′14″N 3°56′02″W	Category B	40565	Upload Photo
Former Station, Stationmaster's House				55°22′14″N 3°55′29″W	Category C(S)	40566	Upload Photo
Wanlockhead Village 1-18 (Numbers Inclusive) Fraser Terrace				55°23′47″N 3°46′45″W	Category B	17191	Upload Photo
Wanlockhead Village 1-4 Mitchell Place (Numbers Inclusive)				55°23′49″N 3°46′56″W	Category B	17194	Upload Photo
Wanlockhead Village School				55°23′51″N 3°46′47″W	Category C(S)	17195	Upload Photo
Wanlockhead Village Straight Steps (Cottages At Beam Engine)				55°23′58″N 3°47′08″W	Category C(S)	17197	Upload Photo
Blackaddie Bridge (Over River Nith)				55°21′57″N 3°56′04″W	Category B	40536	Upload Photo
100-102 High Street, Council Offices				55°22′00″N 3°55′18″W	Category C(S)	40559	Upload Photo
Wanlockhead Village Burnside				55°23′50″N 3°46′54″W	Category C(S)	17189	Upload Photo
Wanlockhead Village Former Wanlock Manse				55°23′52″N 3°46′50″W	Category C(S)	17230	Upload Photo
Back Burn Road Bridge (Over Back Burn)				55°21′03″N 3°54′03″W	Category C(S)	17251	Upload Photo
Eliock House Bridge (Main Driveway Over Garral Burn)				55°20′45″N 3°53′51″W	Category C(S)	17257	Upload Photo
31,33 High Street				55°22′05″N 3°55′25″W	Category C(S)	40545	Upload Photo
High Street, St Ninians Church, Hall, Gatepiers And Screen Wall				55°21′58″N 3°55′10″W	Category B	40551	Upload Photo
Wanlockhead Village Meadow Foot Burial Enclosure				55°24′11″N 3°47′40″W	Category C(S)	17193	Upload Photo
Craigdarroch Farmhouse				55°20′32″N 3°53′11″W	Category C(S)	17253	Upload Photo
Crawick Viaduct				55°22′39″N 3°55′56″W	Category B	17254	Upload Photo
Euchan Bridge (Over Euchan Water)				55°21′38″N 3°55′55″W	Category C(S)	17258	Upload Photo
Kello Bridge (Over Kello Water At Old Kelloside)				55°22′34″N 3°59′31″W	Category B	17259	Upload Photo
Wanlockhead Village, Belton House				55°23′57″N 3°46′32″W	Category C(S)	17261	Upload Photo
63 High Street, Bank Of Scotland				55°22′03″N 3°55′21″W	Category B	40548	Upload Photo
71, 73 High Street				55°22′02″N 3°55′18″W	Category B	40549	Upload Photo
36 And 40 High Street				55°22′03″N 3°55′26″W	Category C(S)	40556	Upload Photo
Saint Mary Street, Evangelical Union Church				55°22′09″N 3°55′26″W	Category C(S)	40564	Upload Photo
Wanlockhead Village Stewart Place				55°23′54″N 3°47′00″W	Category B	17196	Upload Photo
Church Road, Sanquhar Parish Church, (St Bride`S) And Churchyard Including Hamilton Monument				55°22′13″N 3°55′41″W	Category B	40538	Upload Photo
Crawick Bridge, (A76 Over Crawick Water)				55°22′30″N 3°56′10″W	Category B	40539	Upload Photo
High Street, Monument				55°22′01″N 3°55′16″W	Category C(S)	40550	Upload Photo
Mennock Viaduct				55°21′08″N 3°52′49″W	Category B	17260	Upload Photo
1, 3 High Street, Nithsdale Hotel				55°22′06″N 3°55′30″W	Category C(S)	40541	Upload Photo
27, 29 High Street				55°22′05″N 3°55′26″W	Category C(S)	40544	Upload Photo
35, 37 High Street				55°22′04″N 3°55′25″W	Category C(S)	40546	Upload Photo
74, 76 High Street				55°22′01″N 3°55′20″W	Category B	40557	Upload Photo
Laurie's Wynd, Former Crichton School				55°22′06″N 3°55′18″W	Category B	40561	Upload Photo
Wanlockhead Village Church (Church Of Scotland)				55°23′56″N 3°47′05″W	Category C(S)	17190	Upload Photo
Wanlockhead Village Library				55°23′52″N 3°46′47″W	Category A	17192	Upload another image
Eliock House				55°20′47″N 3°53′56″W	Category B	17256	Upload Photo
78-86 High Street (Even Numbers)				55°22′01″N 3°55′19″W	Category B	40558	Upload Photo
Wanlockhead Village Wanlock House				55°23′55″N 3°46′38″W	Category C(S)	17229	Upload Photo
Eliock Bridge				55°21′14″N 3°53′17″W	Category B	17255	Upload Photo
2 Church Road				55°22′06″N 3°55′31″W	Category B	40537	Upload Photo
11, 13 High Street				55°22′05″N 3°55′29″W	Category C(S)	40543	Upload Photo
High Street, St Ninian's Manse				55°21′58″N 3°55′10″W	Category C(S)	40552	Upload Photo
26 High Street, Royal Bank Of Scotland				55°22′03″N 3°55′27″W	Category B	40554	Upload Photo
28-34 High Street				55°22′03″N 3°55′27″W	Category C(S)	40555	Upload Photo
Queensberry Square, School (Range To North East)				55°22′11″N 3°55′39″W	Category B	40563	Upload Photo

== Key ==
The scheme for classifying buildings in Scotland is:

- Category A: "buildings of national or international importance, either architectural or historic; or fine, little-altered examples of some particular period, style or building type."
- Category B: "buildings of regional or more than local importance; or major examples of some particular period, style or building type, which may have been altered."
- Category C: "buildings of local importance; lesser examples of any period, style, or building type, as originally constructed or moderately altered; and simple traditional buildings which group well with other listed buildings."

In March 2016 there were 47,288 listed buildings in Scotland. Of these, 8% were Category A, and 50% were Category B, with the remaining 42% being Category C.
