= Sanquhar Tolbooth =

Municipal building in Sanquhar, Scotland

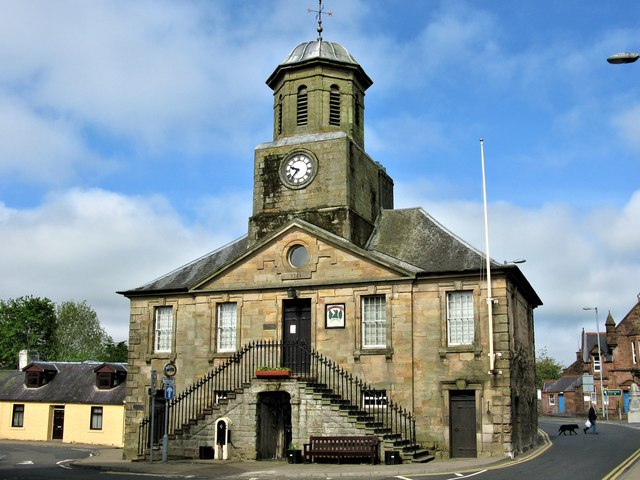
- Sanquhar Tolbooth

- Shown in Dumfries and Galloway
- 55.3680°N 3.9250°W
- Location: High Street, Sanquhar

History
- Built: 1739

Site notes
- Architect: William Adam
- Architectural style: Baroque style

Listed Building – Category A
- Official name: High Street, Tolbooth / Town House
- Designated: 3 August 1971
- Reference no.: LB40540

Sanquhar Tolbooth is a municipal building in the High Street in Sanquhar, Dumfries and Galloway, Scotland. The structure, which accommodates a local history museum, is a Category A listed building.

== History ==
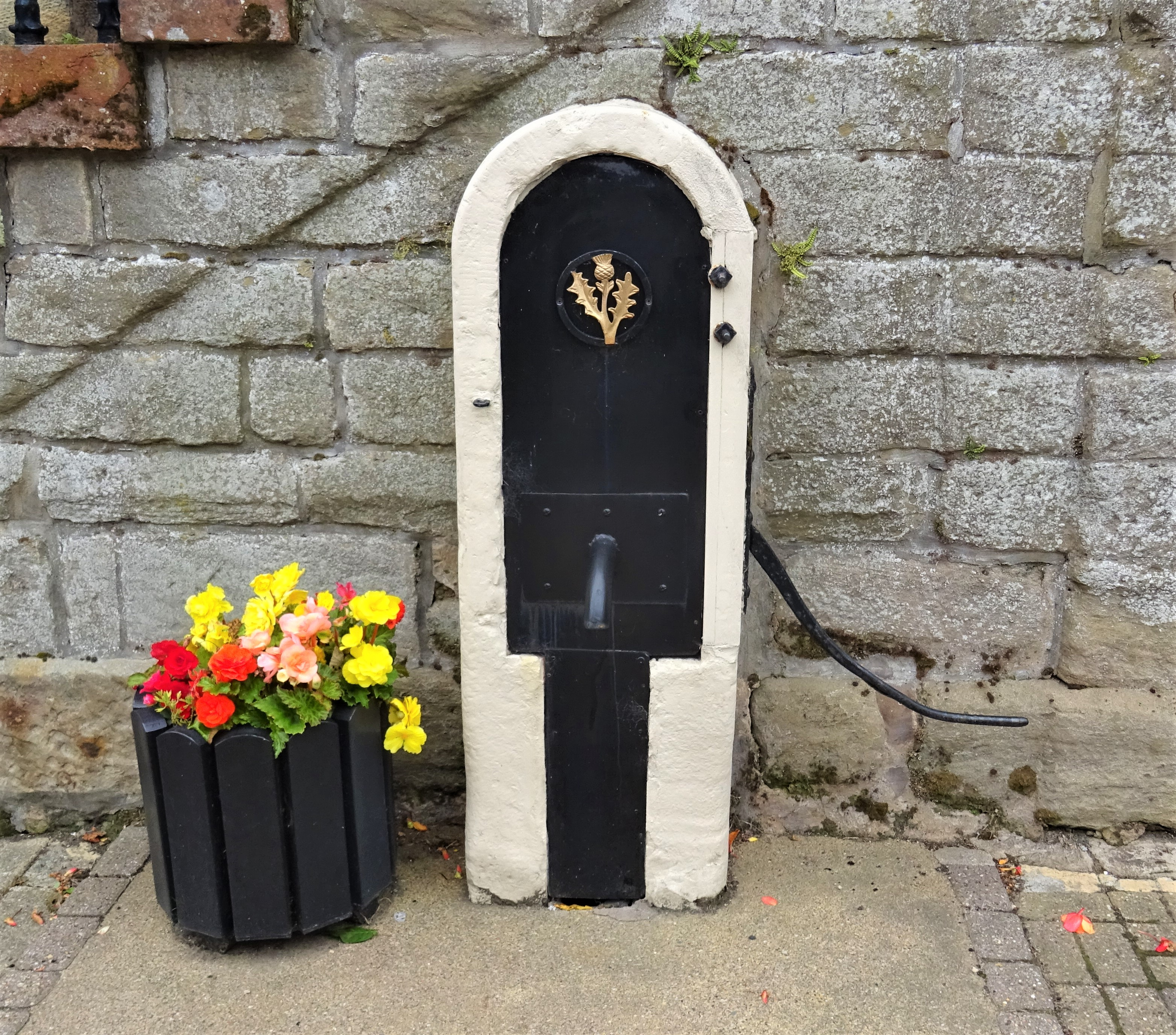
The old tolbooth pump

The first municipal building in Sanquhar was an early tolbooth which dated back to the late 15th century and was already in a dilapidated condition by the 1680s. The condition of the old tolbooth became so bad that, in June 1731, the burgh council decided to demolish it and to replace it with a new building on the same site. The cost of the works was paid for by Charles Douglas, 3rd Duke of Queensberry, whose seat was at Drumlanrig Castle. Construction work on the new building started on 17 February 1735. It was designed by William Adam in the Baroque style, built using stone taken from Sanquhar Castle at a cost of £120 and was completed in 1739.

The design involved a symmetrical main frontage with five bays facing southeast down the High Street; the central section of three bays, which was slightly projected forward featured an external double forestair leading up to a doorway with an architrave and a keystone on the first floor. The other two bays in the central section were fenestrated by sash windows with architraves and keystones and the section was surmounted by a pediment with an oculus in the tympanum. The outer bays contained doorways with architraves and keystones on the ground floor and sash windows with architraves and keystones on the first floor. At roof level, there was a large square base with clock faces surmounted by an octagonal belfry, an ogive-shaped dome and a weather vane. Internally, the principal rooms were the prison cells on the ground floor, the burgh council chamber on the south side of the first floor, an octagonal vestibule in the centre of the first floor, and another reception room on the north side of the first floor.

New cast iron railings were added to the forestair in 1857 and a coat of arms of the Crichton family, the former owners of Sanquhar Castle, was placed on the front of the building in the late 1950s. It continued to serve as the meeting place of the burgh council for much of the 20th century but ceased to be the local seat of government when the enlarged Nithsdale District Council was formed in 1975. The building was converted for use as a local history museum in 1989. Artefacts assembled in the museum collection included items associated with the local knitting trade as well as the local mining industry.

Works of art in the tolbooth include a portrait by Jacob Epstein of the former member of parliament, Sir William Cotts.

== See also ==
- List of listed buildings in Sanquhar, Dumfries and Galloway
