= Kirkbride, Durisdeer =

Coordinates: 55.3317°N 3.8068°W

Kirkbride, Durisdeer: Kirkbride
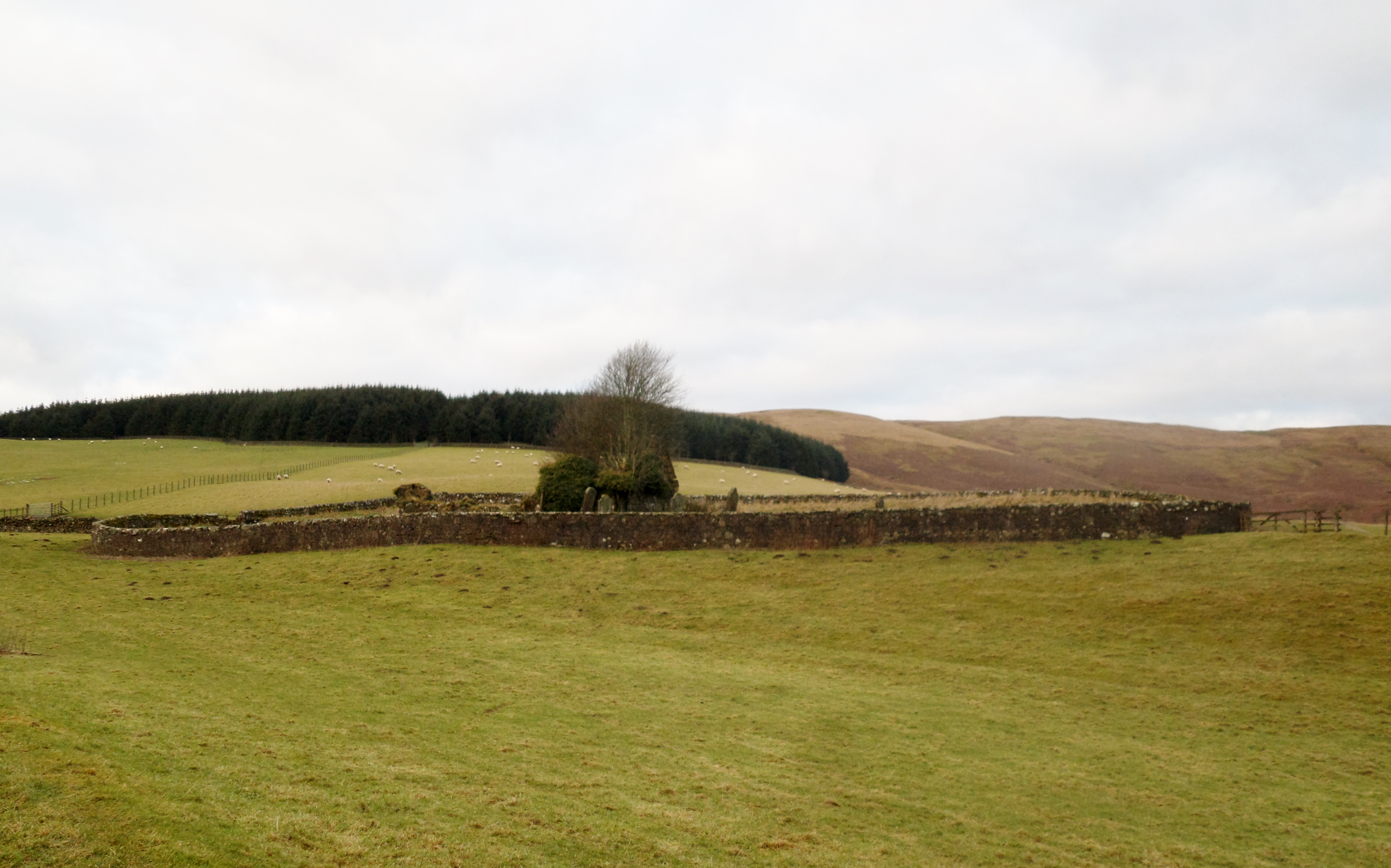
- Kirkbride and cemetery

- Location within Dumfries and Galloway
- OS grid reference: NS854056
- Council area: Dumfries and Galloway
- Lieutenancy area: Dumfries
- Country: Scotland
- Sovereign state: United Kingdom
- Post town: Sanquhar
- Police: Scotland
- Fire: Scottish
- Ambulance: Scottish
- UK Parliament: Dumfriesshire, Clydesdale and Tweeddale
- Scottish Parliament: Dumfriesshire

Kirkbride, previously Kilbride was an ancient parish close to the village of Enterkinfoot, the lands of which lay on both sides of the River Nith in the old Strathnith area of Dumfries and Galloway, Scotland, about 5 miles south of Sanquhar and north of Closeburn. The parish was suppressed and divided between Durisdeer and Sanquhar parishes in 1732. The ruins of the Kirk are a scheduled monument and the surrounding graveyard is a Category B listed building with the River Nith in the valley below. The Ha Cleuch Burn flows through the glen that lies to the east of the site with a lane reaching it that runs up from Enterkinfoot, ending at Coshogle Farm.

== History ==
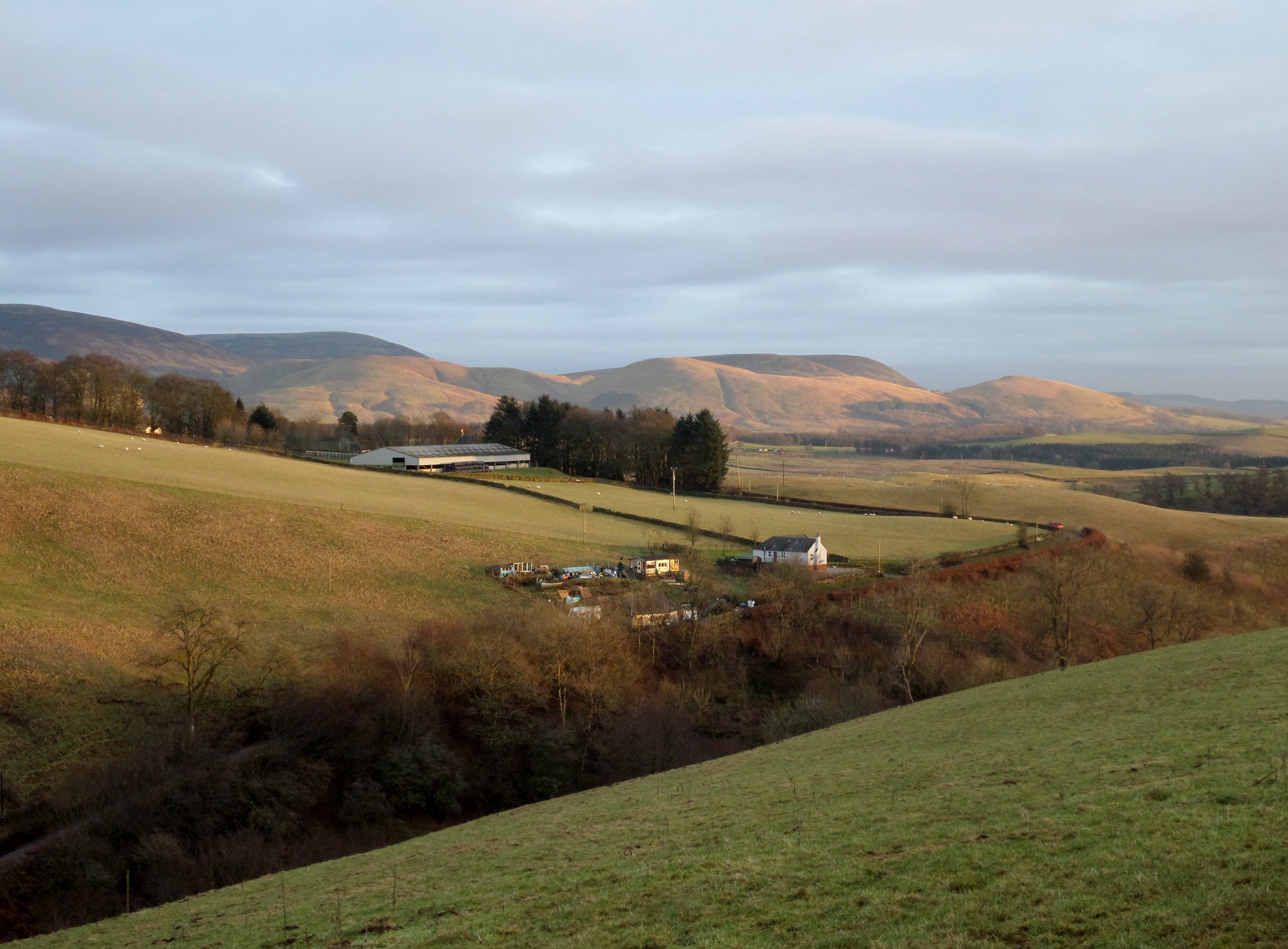
The view from Kirkbride looking across the Ha Cleuch to Coshogle.

The church of Kirkbride, dedicated to St Bride, Brigit, Brigid or Bridget, is said to have been founded by St Mungo, along with St Conal's at Kirkconnel and was granted to the monks of Holyrood Abbey during the 13th century reign of Alexander II and had been within the Presbytery of Pont. Debate continues over whether St Bride was a true saint, as the Celtic goddess Brigid has the same name, feast day and other links. In 1240, William, Bishop of Glasgow confirmed the grant. It became an independent rectory or parsonage and remained as such until the Reformation. Walter de Lillesclif was the parson at the time of Edward I, and it is recorded that after he had sworn fealty to Edward I, the Sheriff of Dumfries restored him in that post with all its possessions. In the 16th century at the time of James V, the church lay in the Deanery of Nith and was taxed at £6 13s 4d. The advowson or right as the feudal superiors to appoint the minister, lay with the Douglas family of Drumlanrig from the time of James VI until the parish was suppressed by the Lords Commissioners of Tiends in 1732.

=== The old kirk and churchyard ===
Kirkbride (NS854056) stands high to the south of Sanquhar, dedicated to St Bride and granted to Holyrood Abbey in the 13th century. The present day ruins at this site are of a rectangular church that was reportedly built in the early 16th century, traditionally orientated east to west with a small sacristy extending from the northern wall. It is said to have held no more than a hundred of a congregation and was only the second church in Scotland built after the Reformation, although it replaces an older chapel. Some of the church structures have disappeared due to the robbing for the buildings of the nearby Kirkbride Farm, which was once also the site of a mill. The parish was suppressed and annexed to Sanquhar and Durisdeer in 1732 although some other references give the date as 1727.

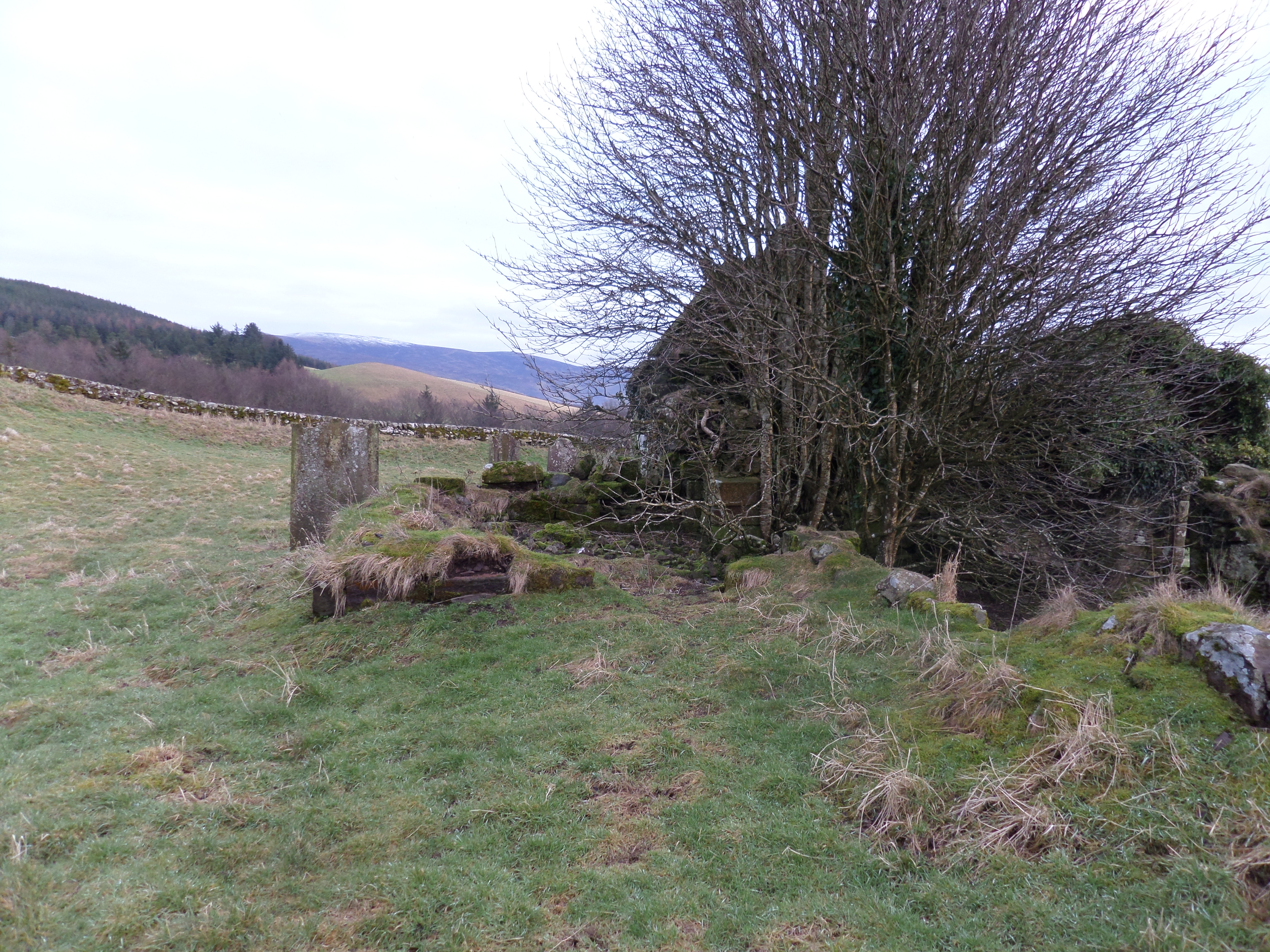
The old gable end and belfry remnants.

Kilbride was the first parish in the South-West of Scotland to join the reformed faith and at first the use of the church was denied to the congregation, who were forced to meet in the west corner of the churchyard around an ancient thorn tree. In the annual list of excommunications by the Pope at that time is listed, the ancient Kirkbride thorn tree.

The south side of the Kirk has the visible remains of an unusually narrow door and two windows, one near the altar and another at the western end of the nave. A substantial rectangular block of stonework lying inside represents the old belfry that was still in situ in 1912. In the wall at the intersection with the sacristy is a stone exhibiting carved interlace Celtic-style decoration that may be part of an old cross. In 1912, an arch with a chamfered edge lay between the sacristy and the nave. The fragments of a statue of an ecclesiastic referred to as "Gabrialdus" is recorded as being visible among the stones of the ruin in 1912. The narrow entrance door is unusual and had a pointed arch made of two stones that stood in 1920 but has now fallen. In the north-east angle of the church in 1920, a fragment of a tombstone was recorded bearing the inscription "Orate Propiciet" in Gothic lettering, translating as "Pray for the soul".

It is recorded that an ex-provost of Sanquhar, Abraham Crichton, had the old Kirk partly un-roofed in the 1740s as he regarded the congregation as being largely Whigs and therefore with Covenanter and Hanoverian sympathies, whilst he was probably a Tory and a Jacobite. He had stated that he would "Sune ding doon the Whig's sanctuary". However, work ceased when a terrible storm arose, and he died shortly after from a fall from his horse. The old congregation had been petitioning for services to be resumed, and they took Abraham's death as a punishment by God for his role in the suppression of the old parish and his act of sacrilege against the building.

The church is very similar to the early 16th century church at Little Dalton.

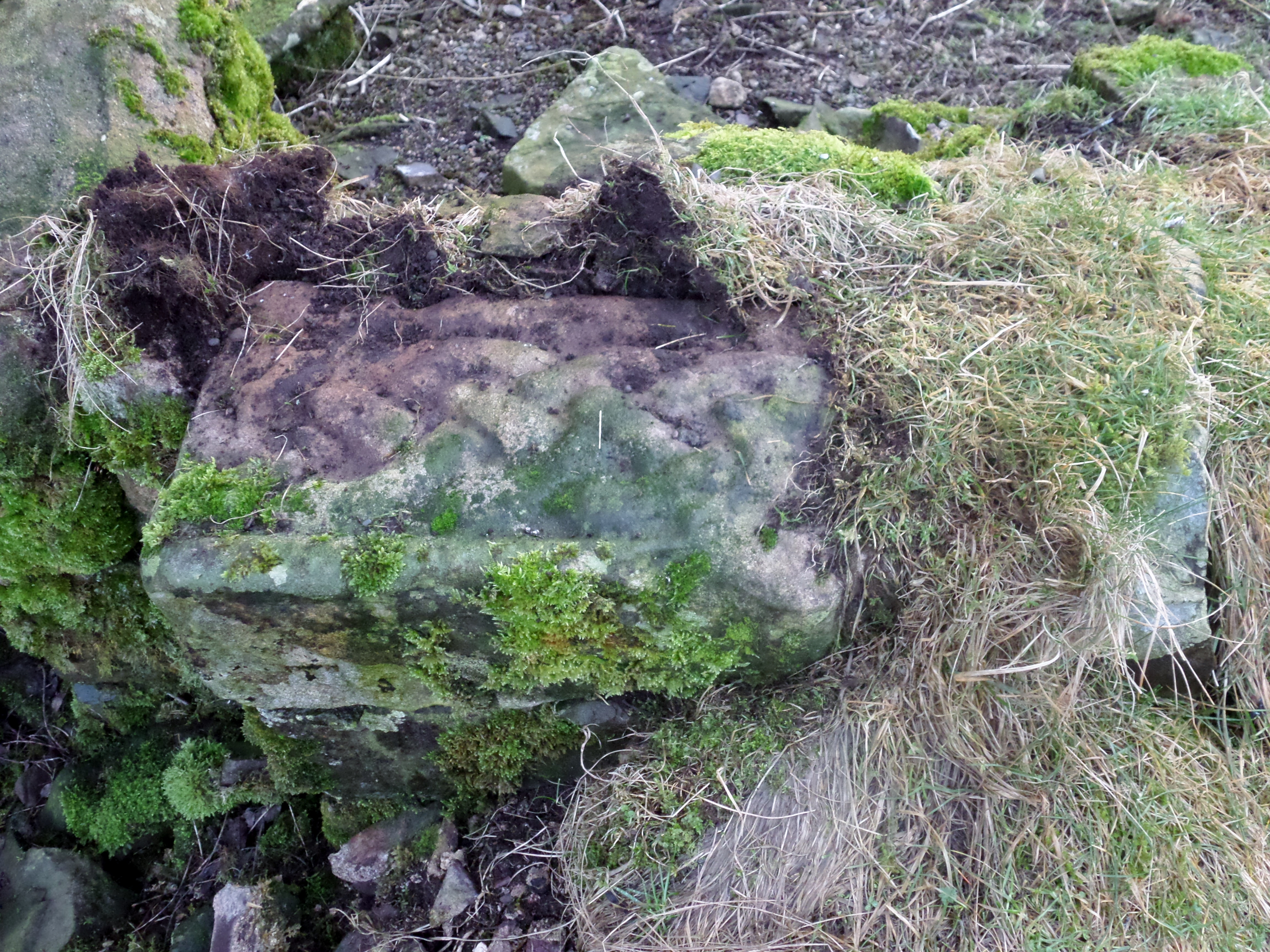
Celtic interlace carving on a re-used cross shaft (Turf was replaced).

The Category B Listed churchyard contains several 17th and 18th gravestones with an approximately quadrangular graveyard surrounded by a plain rubble-built walls that are quite high in places due to the slope on which the site is located. The graveyard gateway stands to the east and has plain iron gates. In 1807, it was recorded that the graveyard was still being used for burials by local families.

The church bell was stolen some time after its abandonment and was traced to Glasgow, where it had been recognised by the sound of it when ringing. It was brought back and re-hung in the small belfry on the gable end. However, the belfry collapsed and the whereabouts of the bell is at present unknown.

A 1725 Communion Token for Kirkbride, designated as 'KB', is held by the Dumfries Museum.

=== The manse ===
It is not clear where the manse stood however it may have been at Kirkbride Farm and mill. A description of it refers to it having a castle like appearance with thick walls built to withstand the fierce gales. It was demolished prior to 1846 and was of such strength that considerable effort was needed to reduce it to rubble.

=== Ministers ===
Walter de Lillescliff is the first recorded person in the time of Edward I. The story is told of one of the curates who held office prior to the Reformation being hounded from the parish by a group of five parishioners led by another named Clark. The curate had woefully neglected his duties and the six men arrived at the manse one day, demanded to see the curate and, after being observed by him they found that he has escaped through a window and the last they saw of him he was running up beside the Stroquhairn Burn on his way to Wanlockhead and safety.

Rev Peter Rae

In 1732, the parish ceased to exist and the last minister, who had served from 1703, was the Revd Peter Rae, who courted controversy among his parishioners by running a printing press from around 1712 at Kirkbride and later at Dumfries. His business published the 'Dumfries Mercury', that was Scotland's first newspaper outside of Glasgow and Edinburgh. Rae also published his own writings, including a discourse against the Acts of Union that took place in 1707 and "A History of the Late Rebellion (1718)", both of which are still cited today. He named his eight-year-old son as the proprietor of his publishing business in an attempt to divert criticism. Among his other involvements were making an astronomical clock that hung in Drumlanrig Castle, surveying Lochar Moss and acting as an agent for the Wanlockhead lead mines. He married Agnes Corsane, who was born in 1671 and died in 1748. The sentiments of his flock are best expressed by a wit who wrote:

"The printing trade he now does try,
The minister trade he should lay by."

One surprising insight into his character was that he was once placed before the Pont Presbytery for attacking a local woman who he believed to be a witch. He hit her on the forehead and drew blood, this being the supposed method of bringing an end to malign influence, the 'Evil Eye'. He soon after became the Clerk to the very same presbytery.

== Kirkbride Mill ==
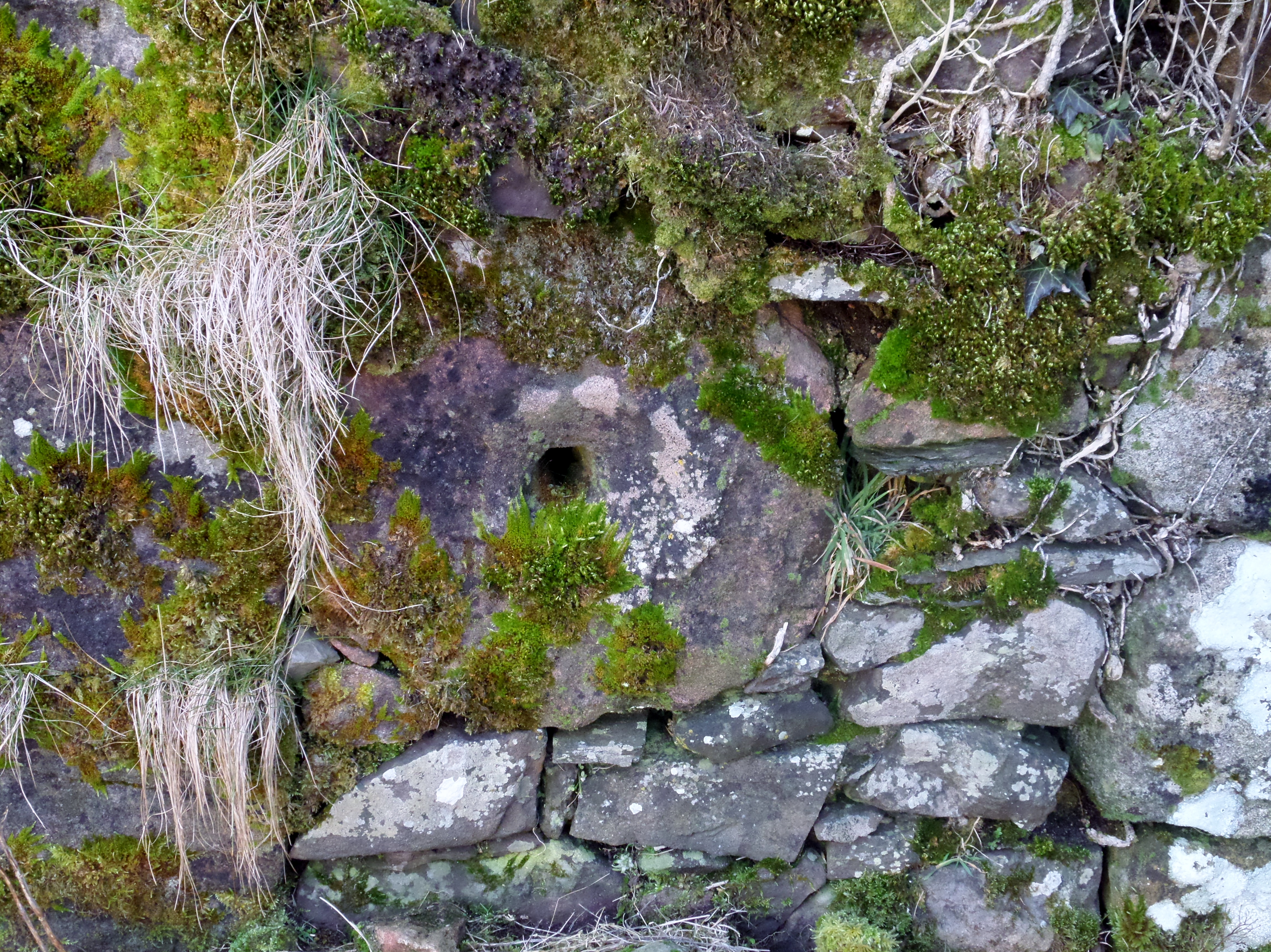
A possible worn grindstone set into the church wall near the door.

The 1856 OS map alone shows a dam and mill pond on the Stroquhairn Burn with sluices and a mill race running down to Kirkbride Farm with the water, then leaving via an unnamed burn to join the Ha Cleuch Burn. A very worn grindstone is incorporated into the south wall of the church near the door.

== Cartographic evidence and place names ==
Etymology
The name Hapland may derive from 'Whaup Land'; a 'whaup' being Scots for a curlew.

In the 1660s, a Cashogill Wood [sic] is recorded and extends as far as Kilbryd Kirk [sic]. The March Cleugh is a small burn that flows from near Kirkbride Hill and joins the Stroquhairn Burn. The Ha Cleuch Glen Burn runs down to join the Enterkin Burn at the level the old Enterkin Cottages site. Priestcrown Wood lies above the railway in the area of the masonry wall support and a Holy Well lies on the lands of Hapland Farm of which no history survives. In 1904, a track ran from near the Kirk down past Priestwood Cottage, later named Woodhead, to join the valley road at the Lime Cleuch. A trackway ran from Kirkbride Farm to Wanlockhead via the Lagdow Cairn. A 'Priest Wood' is recorded on a map of 1832 lying below the old church.

== Covenanters ==
The congregation of Durisdeer Church hold a Conventicle every year at Kirkbride. This open-air preaching was held regularly in secret during the Covenanting times and revived in 1957 by the minister of Durisdeer, the late Rev Bill Scott.

A white marble Northumbrian Cross, the 'Martyrs Cross', stands in the Dalgarnock burial ground, erected in 1925 and carved as a memorial to the 57 (54 men and three women) Nithsdale Covenanters who gave their lives for their faith. A letterbook relating to the erection of this cross was kept at Hornel Library, Kirkcudbright.

The names of the martyr's are listed with the places and dates of death where known, and the following death locations relate to these area of Nithsdale:

George Allan, Penpont
William Brown, Sanquhar
Margaret Gracie, Penpont
Robert Morris, Sanquhar

James Harkness led the famous 'Enterkin Raid' when he led a band of 40 Covenanters who rescued seven out of nine fellow Covenanters who were being taken to Edinburgh via the nearby 'Enterkin Path' to be sold into slavery in America. He was captured by Claverhouse but escaped and fled to Ulster, only returning after the 'Killing Times' ended. His brother Thomas was however hung at the Grassmarket in Edinburgh and his name is on the Martyrs Cross. This is the famous Harkness family who were staunch Covenanters with many stories told of their trials and tribulations.

The Lagdow Cairn on Kirkbride Hill is a small monument of stones that is said to commemorate the site where a person named Dow was shot by Sir Robert Grierson, the Laird of Lag and as a consequence the Cairn's name is derived from the surnames of Lag & Dow.

A story is told of two Covenanters who were being constantly hunted by the King's troops with no success thanks to the shelter given by the locality and by their friends and neighbours. The troops unusually decided to instead capture the men's wives and take them into custody to force the capitulation of their husbands. Being warned, on many occasions the wives easily avoided capture. However, one day they were caught in open country and the best they could do was hide in amongst the bracken and heather. Despite the soldiers walking through where they lay, they were not discovered and this was taken as being akin to 'Peden's Blanket' where fog hid the righteous.

== The Ghost of Abraham Crichton ==
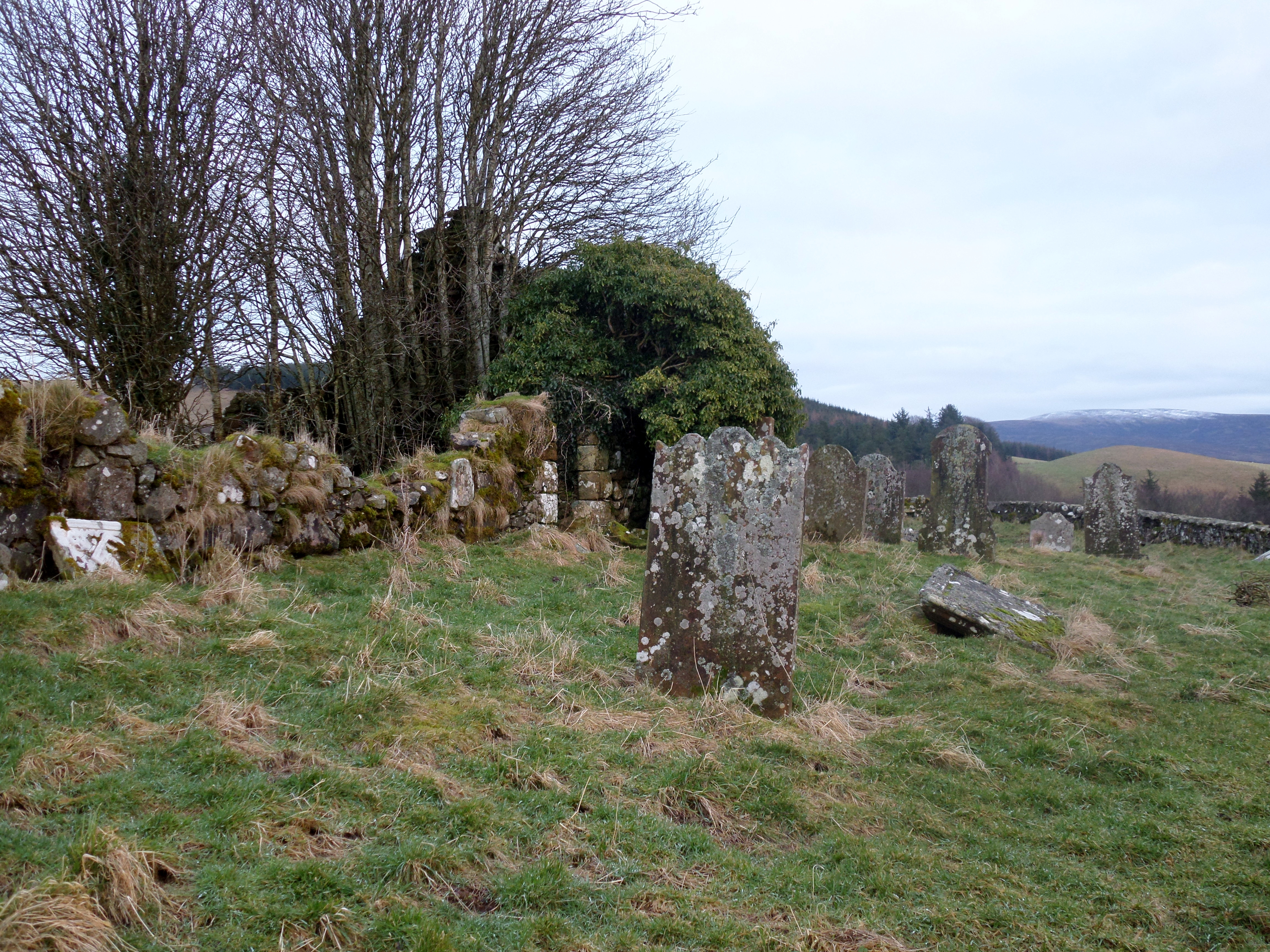
The churchyard and old entrance door.

Abraham Crichton, Provost of Sanquhar in 1734, was a wealthy merchant in Sanquhar. In 1741, he was declared bankrupt. However, it was generally believed that he had hidden his fortune. As stated, he took an active part in the abolition of the services at Kirkbride and of its existence as a separate parish. His intention was to “sune ding doon the Whig's sanctuary” by removing the roof of the church. However, divine influence is said to have intervened, and a violent storm forced the labourers to abandon their work and they did not return. Shortly after, Abraham died from a fall from his horse, taken as a sign of divine retribution and, in addition, reports began of his ghost haunting the old Kirk where he had ironically been buried. Reports differ on whether his appearances were solely restricted to the cemetery grounds. However, he is said to have made a thorough nuisance of himself over a considerable period of time by causing milkmaids to drop their pails of milk and run for safety, terrifying local miners and generally scaring old and young, men and women, all and sundry.

The locals decided that this must stop as it had also become the talk of South-West Scotland and was even being discussed in Edinburgh. The Revd Hunter from the presbytery at Pont was approached and he agreed to spend the night in an attempt to exorcise the ghost. In this he was successful and Abraham haunts the site no more, however although the minister never revealed his methods he advised that his adversary's tomb should be bound with thick metal chains and weighed down with a large boulder.

== See also ==
- Barburgh Mill, Closeburn
- Deil's Dyke - A linear earthwork.

== Bibliography ==
- Chalmers, George (1824). Caledonia: Or, An Account, Historical and Topographic, of North Britain. London : T. Cadell.
- Hewison, James King (1912). Dumfriesshire - Cambridge County Geographies. Cambridge : Cambridge University Press.
- RCAHMS. (1920) The Royal Commission on the Ancient and Historical Monuments and Constructions of Scotland. Seventh report with inventory of monuments and constructions in the county of Dumfries. Edinburgh : HMSO.
- Wood, Rog (2010). Old Sanquhar Tales - A Collection of Folklore. Dumfries : Dumfries & Galloway Council. ISBN 978-1-899316-74-8.
