= Deer hay wind =

Feature used in the capture or management of deer

A deer hay wind, deer fold or elrick is an artificial, natural or modified natural feature used in the culling, capture or management of deer in relation to deer parks or natural woodland and open countryside. These structures have existed for many centuries and after falling out of use and their function having been forgotten the more substantial earth or stone examples have attracted names such as Roman Trenches, Old Fortifications, etc. The hinds were the main target of the hunt. Deer dykes were also a substantial landscape feature built to exclude deer from crops on newly cleared land with ditches on the outside and hedges or wooden fences on top of stone banks.

== History ==
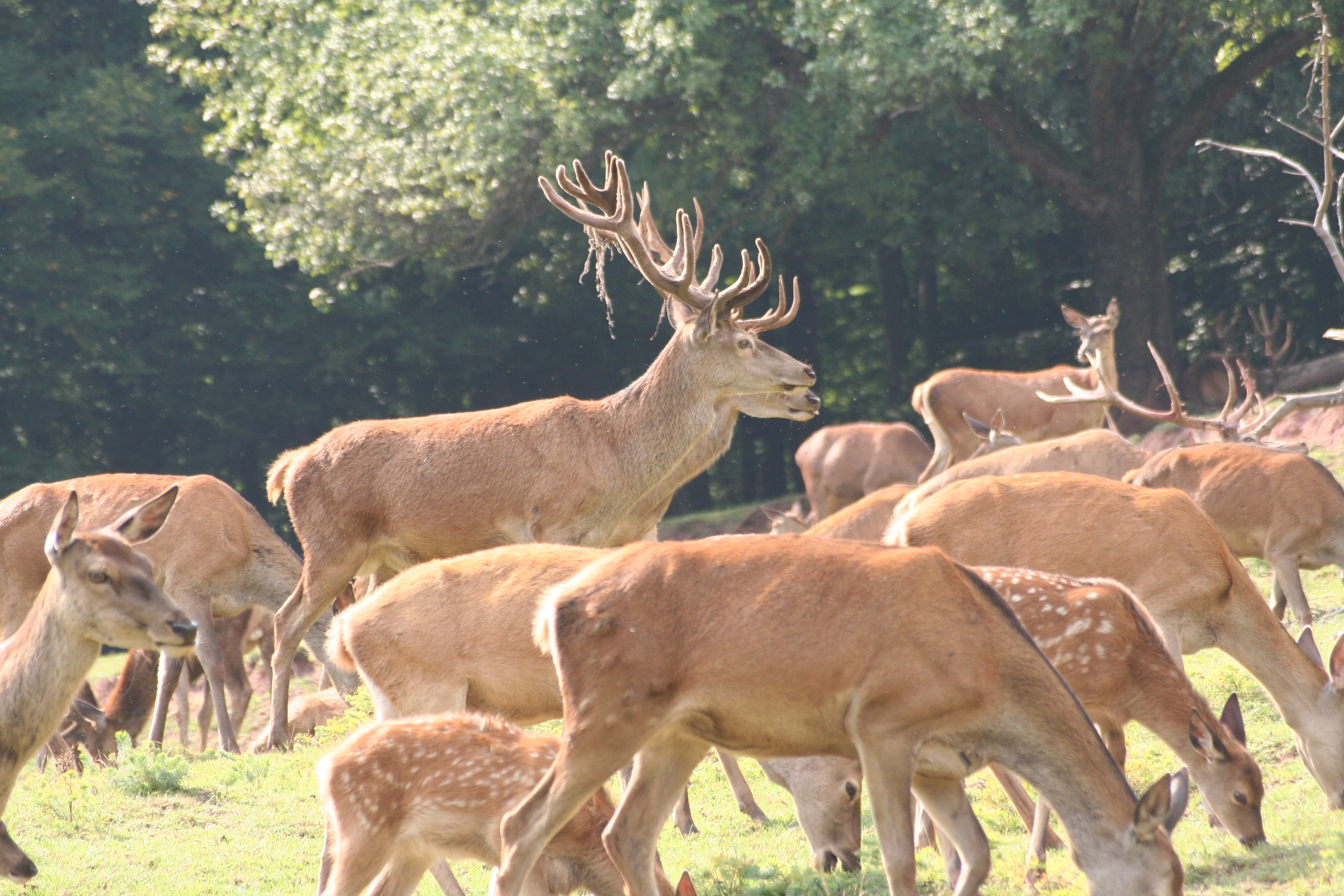
Red Deer stags and hinds

Deer hay winds, folds and elricks were sites where by means of traps wild deer were killed or caught. Evidence that during Saxon times deer hunting was taking place in this fashion survives in a tract written by a 10th-century monk called Ælfric who wrote "I weave myself nets and set them in a suitable place and urge on my dogs so that they chase the wild animals until they come into the nets unawares and are thus ensnared and I kill them in the nets."

In several Saxon documents 'Deer Parks' are recorded to as 'Derhage' or 'Deer-hay'. The Saxon word haga means a palisade or pale, an enclosure, hedge, or set of nets and is also regarded as the etymological root of the word hay. The term haga or hay effectively came to mean a deer park. The words haga, hage, hege, haia, etc. all relate to the managing of deer. Domesday Book records 31 parks with a few still held by Anglo-Saxons. The 'deer-hays' of Anglo-Saxon times would have been more or less temporary structures although some may have developed into places where deer were kept until such a times as they were needed at which point they would be killed.

Imparkment developed from the 12th to the 14th centuries, reaching its peak in the early 1300s at which time around 3,200 parks in England covered up to 2% of the total land area representing about a quarter of the country’s woodland.

The word elerc or erelc in Gaelic originally meant 'ambush' and later meant a 'deer trap' described as a funnel-like defile, artificial or natural into which deer were herded so that they could be contained and then killed. The personal or place name 'Elrick' is linked to such deer traps. The Gaelic name Tainchell was the term used for the group of beaters who took part. The Gaelic word 'eilid' means a hind and this association may explain why the word after linguistic evolution in Wigtownshire to 'eileirg' or ' eileirig' with the meaning of 'deer-trap' and the local place-names 'Eldrig', 'Elrig', 'Elrick', etc. derive from this source and some of the defiles used in the hunt can still be identified.

== Structure and function ==
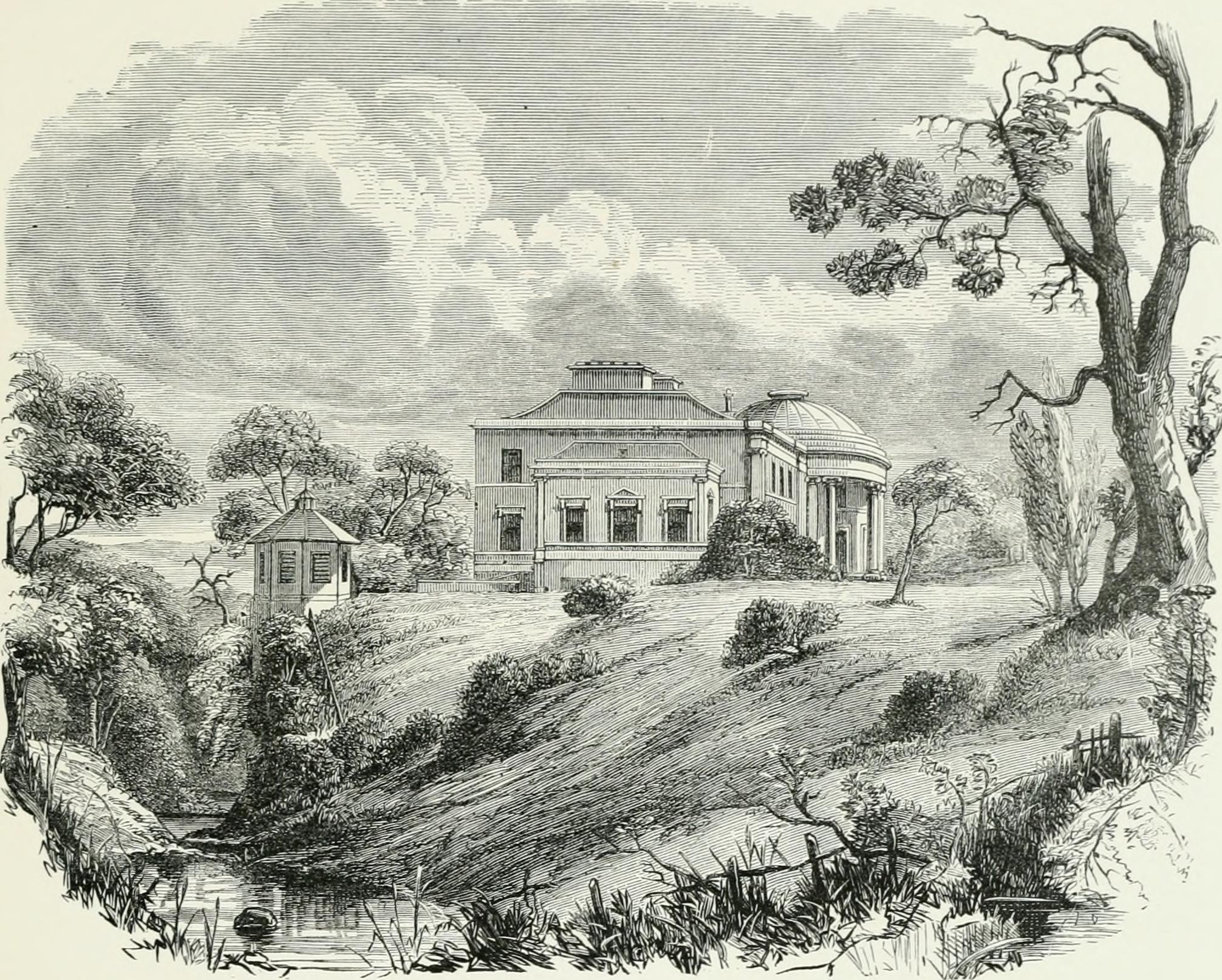
Quillisfield or Coilsfield House.

The capture and movement of deer from the wild or from established deer hays or parks was necessary for establishing new ones and for restocking existing ones to replace animals lost via excessive hunting or disease and at times to introduce new breeding stock to maintain vigour in isolated and inbred populations. Deer might also be managed in terms of castrating stags and selectively culling diseased or elderly animals. In feudal times the monarch would at times make gifts of live deer to those who were in the royal favour to replenish or establish herds, and a system of capturing deer therefore had to exist.

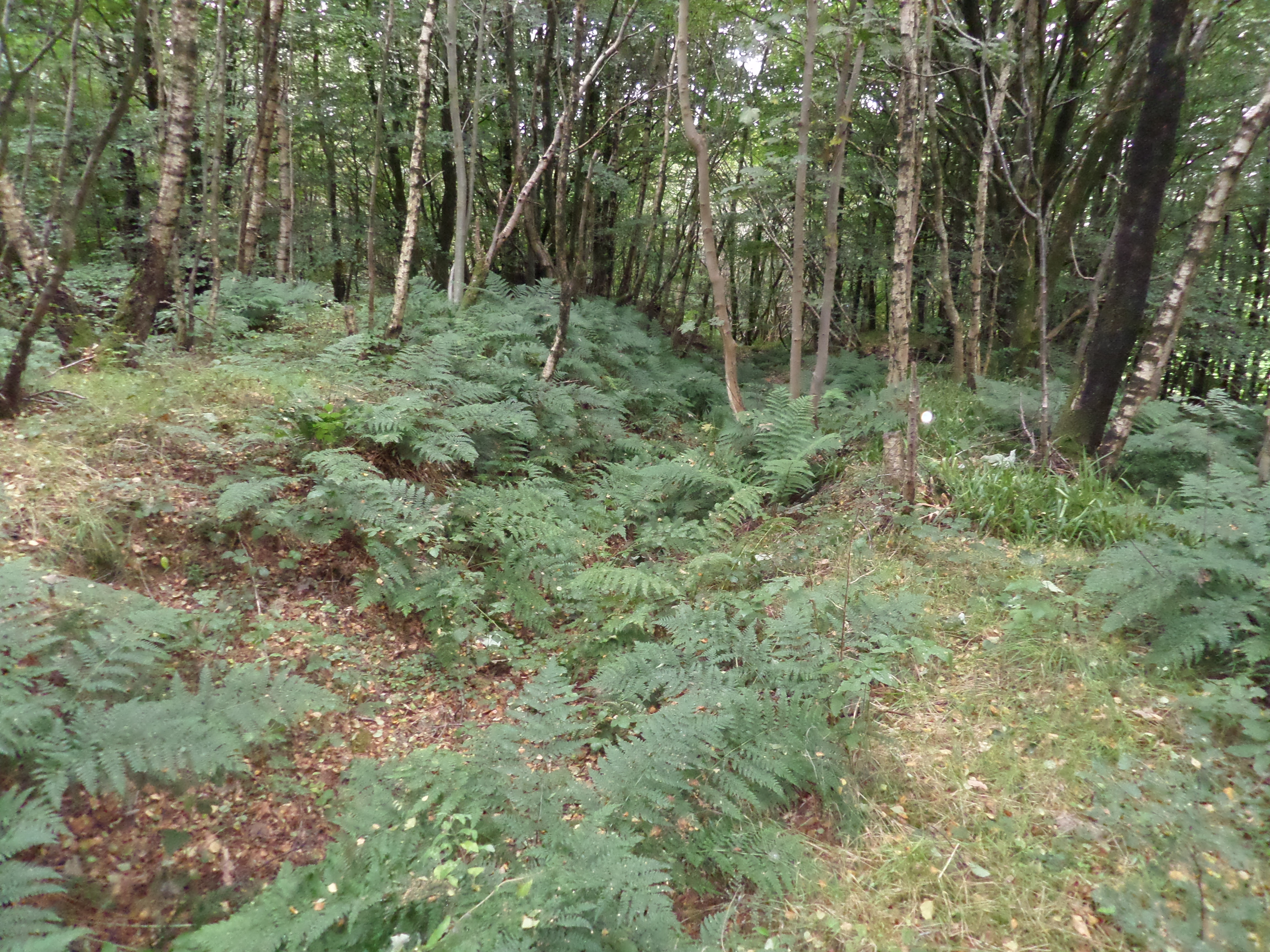
A section of the Parkmoor Deer Hay trenches at Coilsfield

To create a deer park the person had to own the land, purchase a license from the monarch and have sufficient funds to empark the area, constructing pales and ditches, deer leaps or salters, etc. Some parks even had towers from which the deer could be shot with bows and arrows.

Thirty-seven parks or hays are listed in Domesday Book, and of these nine belonged to the king, five by bishops or monastic houses and twenty three by Norman knights, etc. These hays or parks were isolated in the countryside by physical land divisions such as pales with ditches and served to protect the deer which were to be used for hunting and to help keep out predators whilst also preventing wild deer from eating crops in areas where farming was prevalent.

The term 'fence month' was applied to the time during fawning and to the annual rut time in the autumn during which the deer were not disturbed and this restricted the period when deer hay winds and elricks could be used.

Both wattle fencing and nets may have been employed in the 'wynding of the deer hay' and it was also important that the animals could be separated into small groups to reduce the chance of them goring each other by accident. A wide entrance that narrowed down on a gently rising slope would also slow their progress when pursued by hounds and places where people could hide, possibly with hounds until required would be advantageous. The beaters would also separate the stags from the hinds if required.

Elricks or deer hay winds were places in Scotland and England where deer could be channelled and confined in a corral, a practice that ceased to be used in the 18th century although the practice had a brief resurgence in the days of Prince Albert, husband of Queen Victoria. Stone lined pits and boulders once heated in fires have been found in association with elricks which may have been used to cook or render the venison from the newly slaughtered animals. 'Burnt Mounds' that are often horseshoe-shaped are known in Ireland as 'fulacht fiadh' and consist of a pit and heaps of shattered stones that have once been strongly heated. These structures are traditionally associated with the cooking of venison in the water filled pit using the heated stones. It has been found that these structures are also present in Scotland such as four sites in South-West Scotland.

A deer hunt of this type was recorded in the medieval romance Sir Gawain and the Green Knight.

The native Red Deer (Cervus elaphus) and later introduced Fallow Deer (Dama dama) are suited for enclosure in deer parks however European Roe Deer (Capreolus capreolus) are not as they are aggressive towards other deer. Fallow Deer were introduced by the Normans from Sicily, probably in the early twelfth century.

=== Examples of deer hays and elricks ===
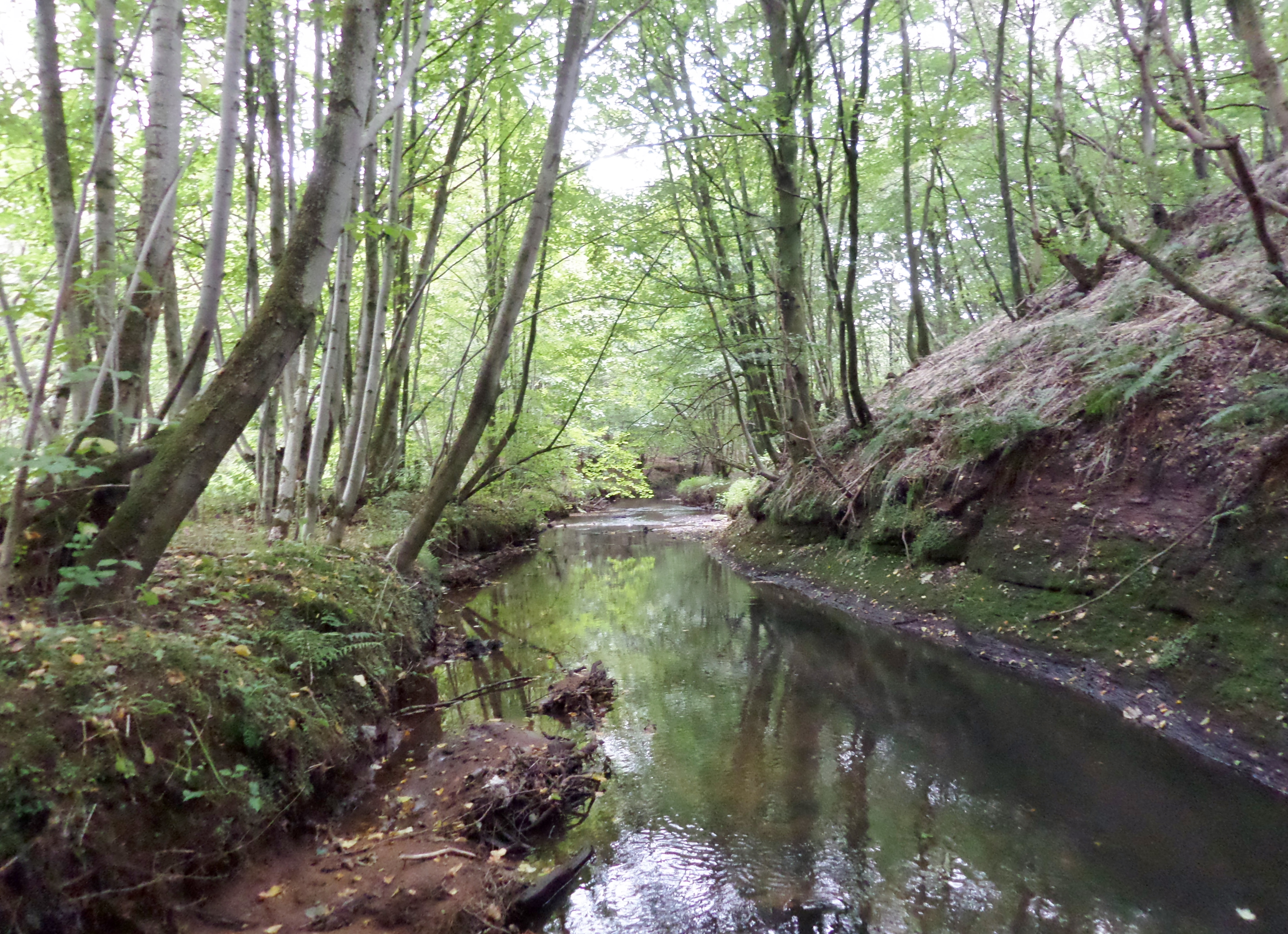
The Windy Gill and the Water of Fail

Near Parkmill Farm on Parkmoor (NS 4425 2693), Tarbolton in South Ayrshire is a complex system of interlinking deep trenches running down to the Water of Fail that were given the name 'Roman Trenches'. The local historian John Smith circa 1895 examined them and also identified what he regarded as an Ancient British Stockade which had been taken following a siege by Roman troops during which the 'Roman Trenches' were built. Some of the trenches are still around 9 feet deep and are recorded to have once been much deeper. They lie within a few hundred metres from a medieval deer park's boundary.

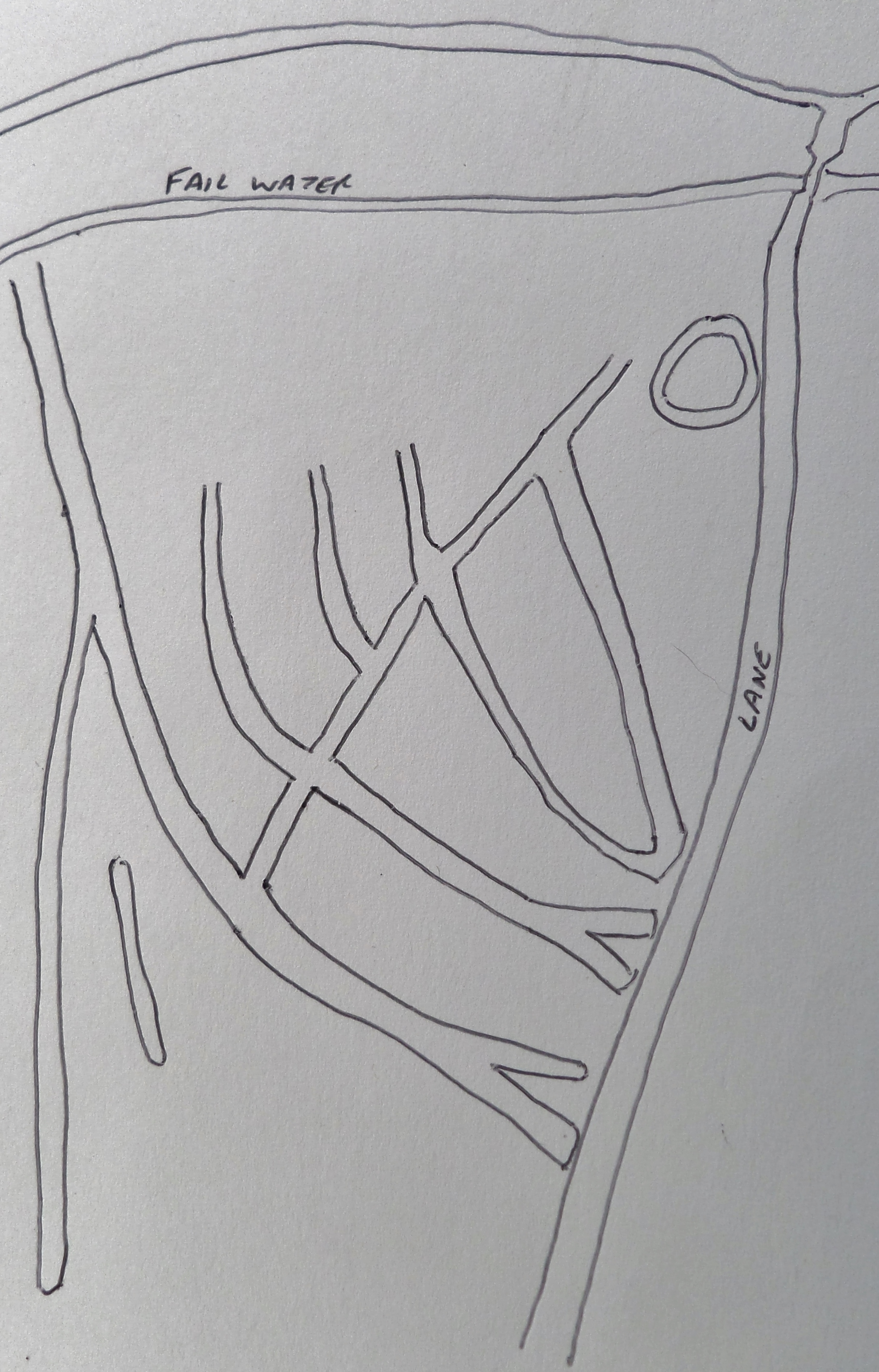
The Parkmoor 'Roman trenches'

In 1428 it is recorded that John Stewart of Darnley near Glasgow held a deer park with a ditch, bank and pale in the Tarbolton area. Place names such as Parkmoor, Parkmill and Parkhill reflect the existence of a deer park in this area and a park with a building and pale is recorded on the 1654 map of Kyle by the cartographer Blaeu taken from an earlier map by Timothy Pont. Herman Moll's map of 1732 shows at least four deer parks in the vicinity of Parkmoor at Fail Abbey, Park Mill, at Coilsholm Wood and at Barskimming.

Once known as 'Quillisfield' the estate was given to the monks of Melrose Abbey by Sir John de Graham of Dunduff, Lord of Tarbolton in the 13th century. After the reformation Coilsfield Castle and Estate was acquired by the Cunninghames of Caprington, it was then sold to the Montgomerie family in 1661. In around 1847 the Coilsfield estate was sold to William Orr who had agreed to become the heir of the architect of the house, John Paterson, on the understanding that he would change his name to Paterson but and also buy the Coilsfield estate, renaming it Montgomerie.

The RCAHMS describes these features on the old Coilsfield Estate as an "irregular series of artificially-cut ditches run roughly parallel in a SE-NW direction down a gently W-facing and wooded slope at c70m OD. They are closely spaced, mostly V-shaped, and range from 0.5m to 2.0m in depth with little evidence of upcast banking. Some conjoin to form wider channels which fade at the steeper slopes above the water of Fail."

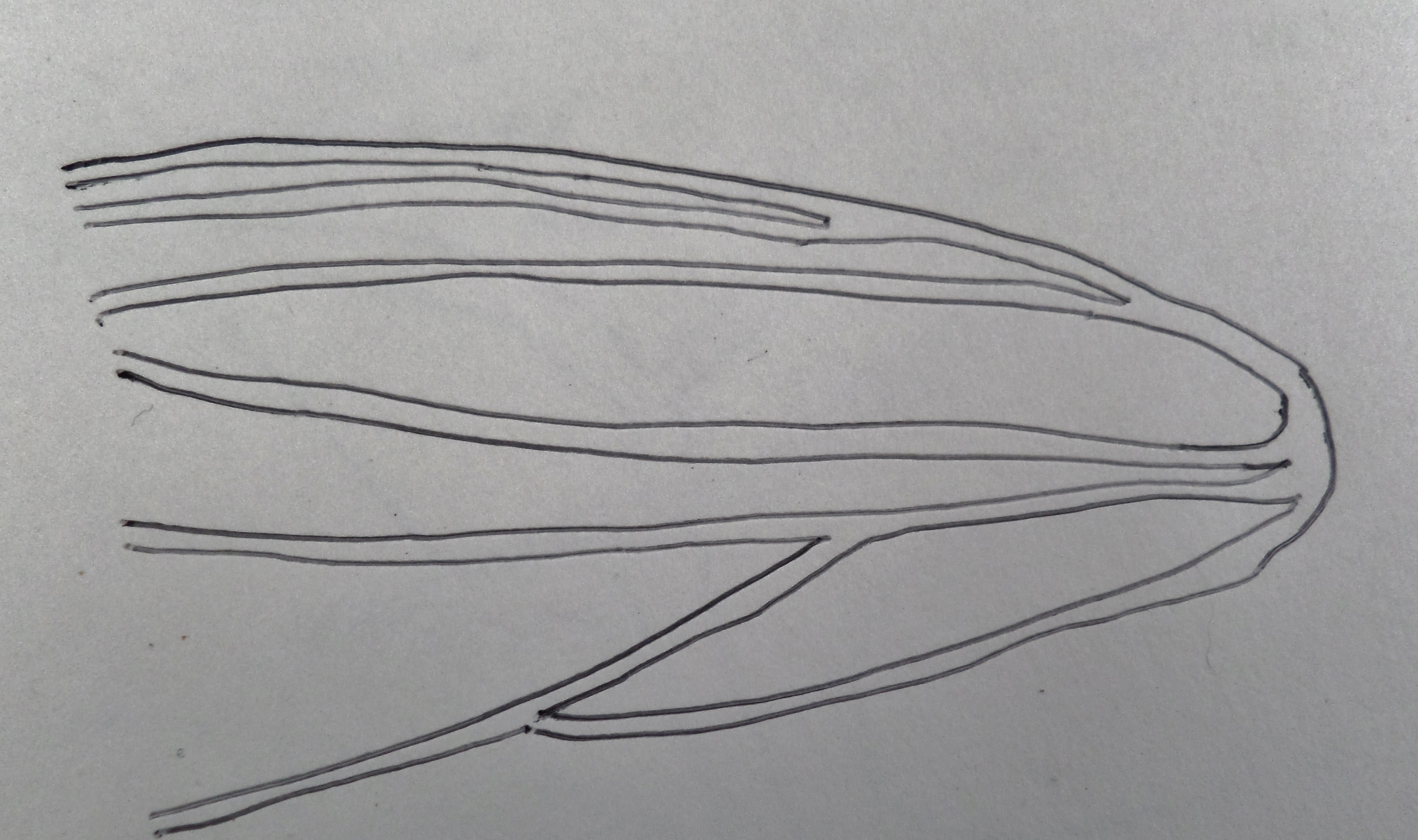
The 'Old Fortifications' at Nuthill.

Taylor has associated the local place names of Wyndford and Windy Gill at Parkmoor with an early 16th-century reference to the winding of the hay yard to catch deer at the Nuthill Estate in Fife and has suggested that this made reference to the construction of wattle fencing and nets along the line of the trench banks in preparation for catching deer and that the system of trenches may have been known as a 'wynd'. In Scots language the word 'Wynd' has been used since at least the 13th century to describe frequently winding, narrow streets or alleys which aptly describes the appearance of known deer hay winds and elricks and wynding would be the creation of narrow alleys or entrances. At Parkmoor the deer would naturally enter the Windy Gill to drink and could then be driven by men and hounds towards the deer hay wind. The area that was supposed by John Smith to be an Ancient British Stockade and the area later used as a bowling green may have been involved in the processing of the deer by comparison with the use of elricks.

On the Nuthill Estate in Fife (NO234079) are a system of trenches surveyed by Thomas Winter in 1757 and recorded as 'The Trenches are Old Fortifications' or 'Roman Trenches'. This complex system of trenches and banks are located near the old royal hunting park of Falkland. This feature is considered to have been used to capture deer from the Lomond Hills by corralling them and then taking suitable hinds and stags to the nearby royal hunting park. The Falkland Treasurers Accounts of 1505 refer to a payment of 14 shillings to "John Balfour for ranging through the countryside with bloodhounds to drive the deer to the park" and for the "winding of the hay yard to catch them". Fields or enclosures called ‘Deerends’ are recorded just to the west of the site.

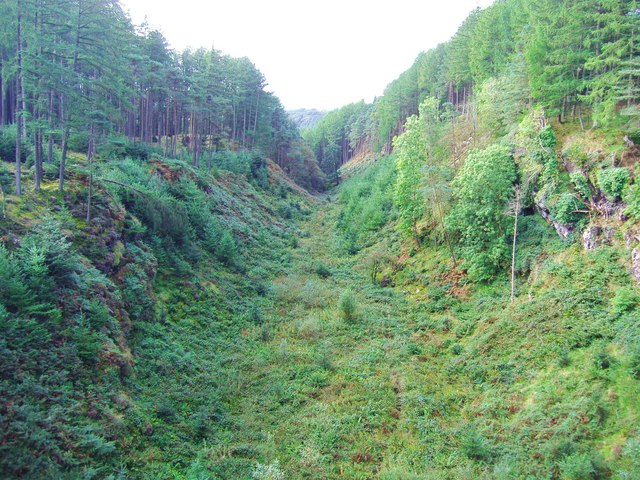
The Glen of the Bar elrick

At Nuthill at least seven trenches can still be discerned with a present-day depth of up to 2 metres and a length of 150 to 200 metres. Some are cut through the bedrock and they curve towards each other towards the west at the bottom of a slope that joins a water course. The glen or gill then acts as a natural channel that runs towards the old Falkland Deer Park and the Lomond Hills lie above. A number of place names suggest the past use of the site such as 'Deerends', 'Greyhound Den' and 'Burn of Deer'.

Indications of similar systems of trenches exist at Chillingham Park in Northumberland and Erringden Park in Yorkshire, additionally "Montrose's Camp" near Fyvie Castle has features in common with deer hay winds famously militarily utilised by Montrose. Kington in Worcestershire is recorded to have had a deer hay.

The as yet unidentified system of trenches and banks at the High Parks in the Cadzow Wood area (NS 7343 5347) of Chatelherault Country Park have a number of characteristics in common with deer hay winds and are located in an area closely associated with the hunting of deer by royalty and others.

Some deer hay winds may have consisted of banks and ditches several kilometres long that were used to direct deer for the purpose of capture such as with the so-called "Deil's Dyke" near New Cumnock. On Jura in the Inner Hebrides tinchels were employed to move the deer in a particular direction such as through a narrow gap and into a small enclosure.

On the island of Rum the remains of walls used to channel deer into small enclosures can still be seen. At Hermitage Castle in the Borders a funnel-shaped existed in addition to a deer park with a pale known as the White Dyke.

Elricks have been identified at Dalkeith and others may have existed at the Glen of the Bar in Galloway, on Rùm and Jura where in one case stone walls may have channelled the deer into a corral. An unusual 'deer trap' may have been the function of a structure with foot high walls at Wet Sleddle Slack near Shap in Cumbria.

A relevant quote here is that "Deer hunting has left physical traces on the landscape in the form of banks and dykes used either as park boundaries or for trapping the deer".

== Micro-history ==
The fourteenth century treatise The Book of Hunting illustrates a scene The Gathering before the Stag Hunt which clearly portrays wattle fencing of the kind used in a deer hay wind.

The town of Hayes in West Middlesex derives its name from the presence of a deer hay in the area.

The village of Elrick near Aberdeen is named after an elrick and the surname 'Elrick' is common in the area.

In 1559 seven acres of land near Tarbolton named Longhuntflat was leased by John Stewart and his wife Helen Cunninghame of Halrig.

== See also ==
- Deer park (England)
