= Durisdeer =

Coordinates: 55°18′55.28″N 3°44′31.72″W

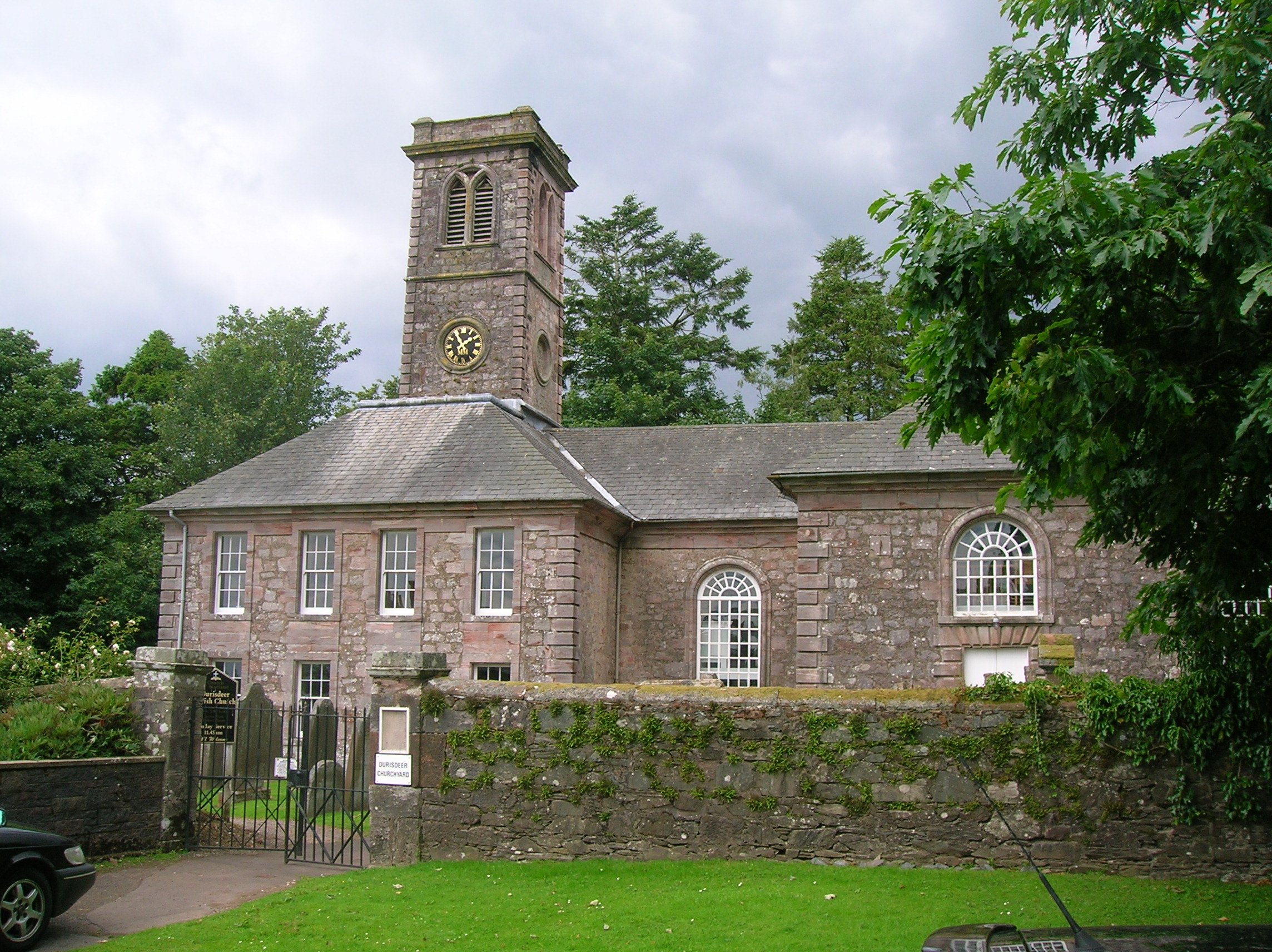
- Durisdeer Church

- Location within Dumfries and Galloway
- OS grid reference: NS893036
- Council area: Dumfries and Galloway
- Lieutenancy area: Dumfries
- Country: Scotland
- Sovereign state: United Kingdom
- Post town: THORNHILL
- Postcode district: DG3
- Police: Scotland
- Fire: Scottish
- Ambulance: Scottish
- UK Parliament: Dumfriesshire, Clydesdale and Tweeddale
- Scottish Parliament: Dumfriesshire

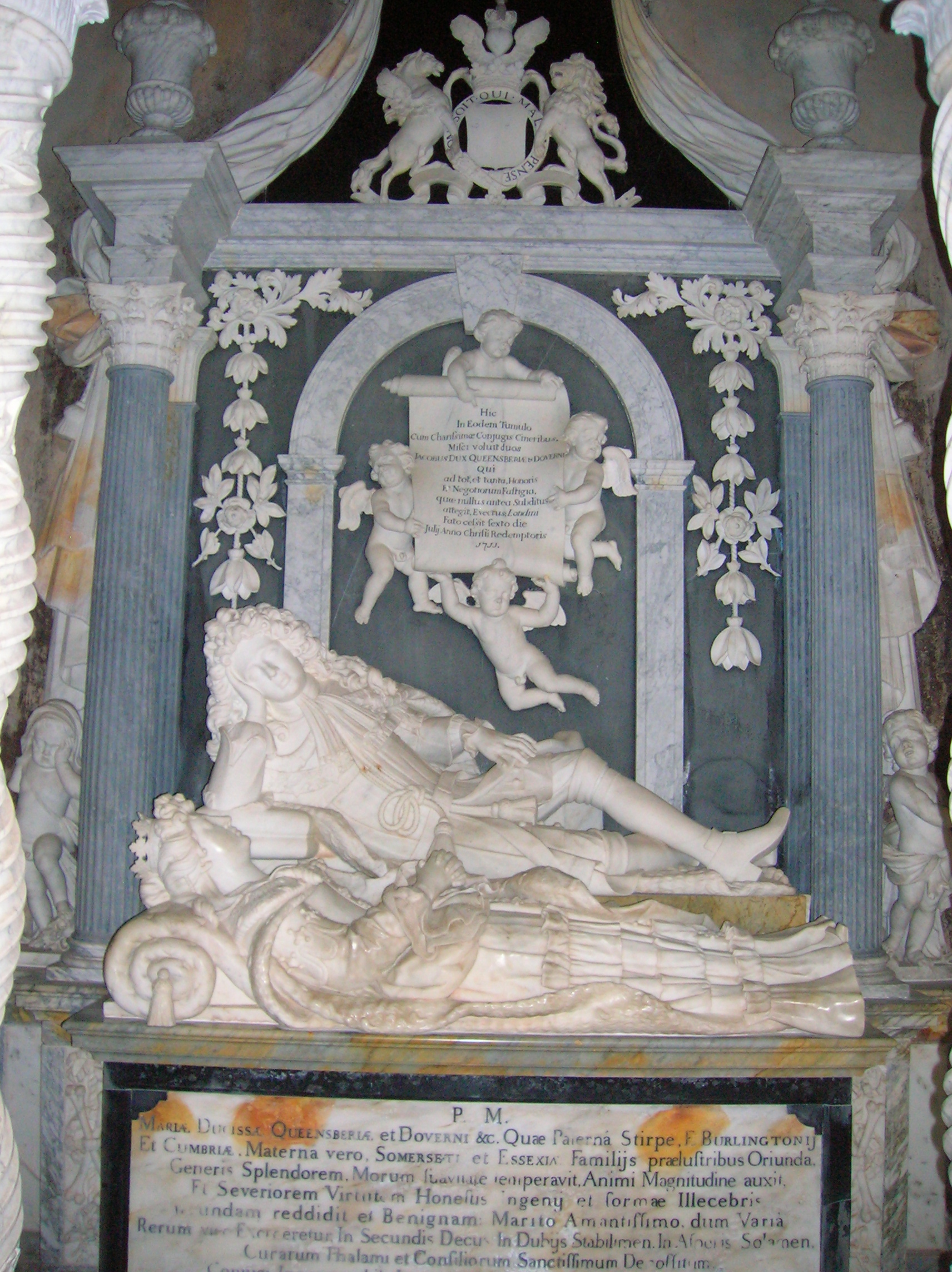
Monument to James Douglas, 2nd Duke of Queensberry, and his wife Mary.

Durisdeer is a small village in Dumfries and Galloway, south-west Scotland, and in the historic county of Dumfries-shire. It lies 6 miles (9.7 km) north of Thornhill, above the Carron Water, a tributary of the Nith.

== History ==
A Roman road once passed through the site of the village as a direct route from Nithsdale to Clydesdale. The remains of a small, but well preserved Roman fortlet are located about a mile up the Well or Wald Path to the north-east; the defensive ditch and rampart are clearly visible.

Two temporary Roman camps, lying to the right of the lane running up to the village, were identified on RAF aerial photographs, although nothing now remains visible to the naked eye.

Having travelled along the 'Well or Wald Path' James IV stayed at Durisdeer in 1497 whilst on a pilgrimage to St Ninian's Church at Whithorn.

The first recorded minister at Durisdeer is John de Cader in 1394, and the original parish church was probably dedicated to St. Mary. There was a burial aisle for the Menzies family, with their names, arms and mottoes. In 1607 Sir James Douglas of Drumlanrig exhumed the body of William Menzies, the latest burial, and reburied him outside. The Menzies returned the body to the aisle, but Douglas threatened William's father, Adam Menzies of Enoch, and exhumed the body a second time. The Privy Council of Scotland condemned Douglas's actions in this feud.

The old church is marked as Dursdyire Kirk in a 1654 map. It was demolished to make way for the present-day church built in 1699, a category A listed building in the village, that also serves Drumlanrig Castle, the 17th-century home of the Duke of Queensberry. Durisdeer Church was rebuilt by the third Duke in the 1720s, to designs by James Smith. Adjoining the church is the slightly earlier Queensberry Aisle, burial place of the dukes, also by Smith, with a large marble monument to the second Duke (1662-1711) and Mary, his duchess, carved by Jan van Nost. The former manse nearby is now a private dwelling.

In 1727 the parish was enlarged by the addition of roughly half of the suppressed parish of Kirkbride.

A marked feature of the church complex are the ducal apartments, which were later used as the parish school at the behest of the Duke. These apartments were renovated and in 1968 were opened again for church use. Hewison records that the stone used to build the new church came from the demolished Durisdeer Castle, "..famous in the Wars of Independence." The masons were the same men who built Drumlanrig Castle.

The clock in the church tower was a gift from the Buccleuch Estates to mark the millennium and the tercentenary of Durisdeer Church.

Durisdeer village mill stands on the Carron Water, some distance away. It is a category B listed building.

Durisdeer was included in the 1978 film version of The Thirty Nine Steps, starring Robert Powell and a film of John Galt's Annals of the Parish made use of the interior of the church.

Andrew de Durisdeer was a 15th-century bishop of Glasgow whose name suggests that he came from Durisdeer, possibly with the surname Muirhead.

== Toponymy ==
Durriseer is recorded in the form Durrysder in 1328. This likely represents Gaelic dubhros 'a dark wood' and doire 'an oak copse'. The name would therefore mean "dark wood of the oak copse."

== See also ==
- Skelmorlie Aisle
- Kirkbride, Durisdeer
- Deil's Dyke - A linear earthwork.
