= Deil's Dyke =

Ancient linear earthwork in Scotland

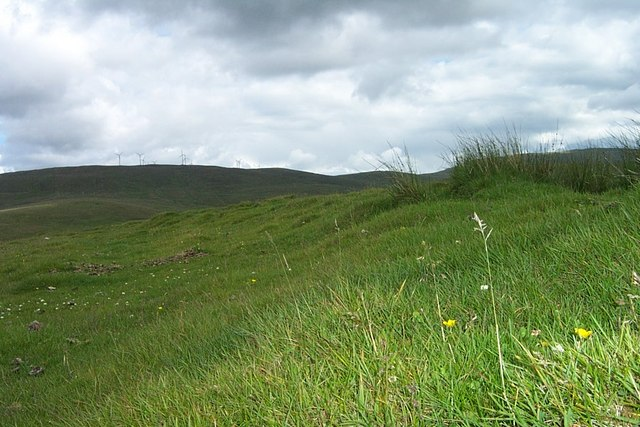
- A section of the Deil's Dyke on Dalhanna Hill at New Cumnock
- Interactive map of Deil's Dyke
- Location: New Cumnock to Durisdeer parish
- Coordinates: NS 8000 0591 to NS 8404 0526
- Designer: Unknown
- Type: Earthwork
- Material: Earth, stones and turf
- Length: Up to 16 mi (26 km)
- Width: 3 m (9.8 ft)
- Height: 0.7 m (2 ft 4 in)
- Completion date: Medieval or Iron Age

Deil's Dyke, Pict's Dyke or Celt's Dyke in south-west lowland Scotland is a linear earthwork that roughly follows the contours that divide upland pasture from lowland arable land, effectively acting like the head-dykes of medieval and later times although its true purpose has not been settled. The Deil's Dyke, sometimes written as 'dike', is formed from an earthen berm of rounded form that varies from 2.0 to 4.0 m (6.6 to 13.1 ft) wide and a maximum of 0.7 m (2.3 ft) high, sometimes having a stone core. Where a fosse accompanies the bank it is usually an inconsequential 0.5 m (1.6 ft) or so in width on average and around 0.4 m (1.3 ft) deep, more often located on the uphill or outfield side. As a defensive structure the dyke has no obvious military value and its erratic route militates against it being a practical political boundary.

== Location ==
The earthwork is not continuous; however, it is generally regarded as running from east of Afton Water (NS 6169 1142) near New Cumnock to Burnmouth (NS 8400 0500) in the parish of Durisdeer, having passed through the parishes of New Cumnock, Kirkconnel and Sanquhar. A detached section ran from the site of the old Durisdeer Castle to the Kirk Burn above Durisdeer village, ending short of the Durisdeer Roman fortlet. The dyke follows contours that lie typically from 500 to 900 ft above sea level.

== History ==
In 1824 the Deil's Dyke is first recorded in print by Chalmers in his 'Caledonia' where he credits Joseph Train, amongst others, for the description of what survived at the time and for recognising its significance, ambiguous as that remains. In 1841 a second report was published as an appendix in MacKenzie's History of Galloway.

Originally it was said to run from Loch Ryan to the shores of the inner Solway and was a boundary between the Picts and the Britons of Strathclyde with a defensive palisade, watchtowers and forts however this has been shown to be incorrect as a number of the linear features included were shown to be head-dykes and other unrelated landscape features. A Dumfries and Galloway survey of 1956 proposed that the dyke runs along a 16 miles route from near Burnmouth Farm (NS 8400 0500), north of Enterkinfoot to Dalhanna Hill, New Cumnock, beside the Afton Water (NS 6169 1142), south-west of New Cumnock. This section is considered to have some credibility as a single structure constructed and planned through the control of a single controlling authority.

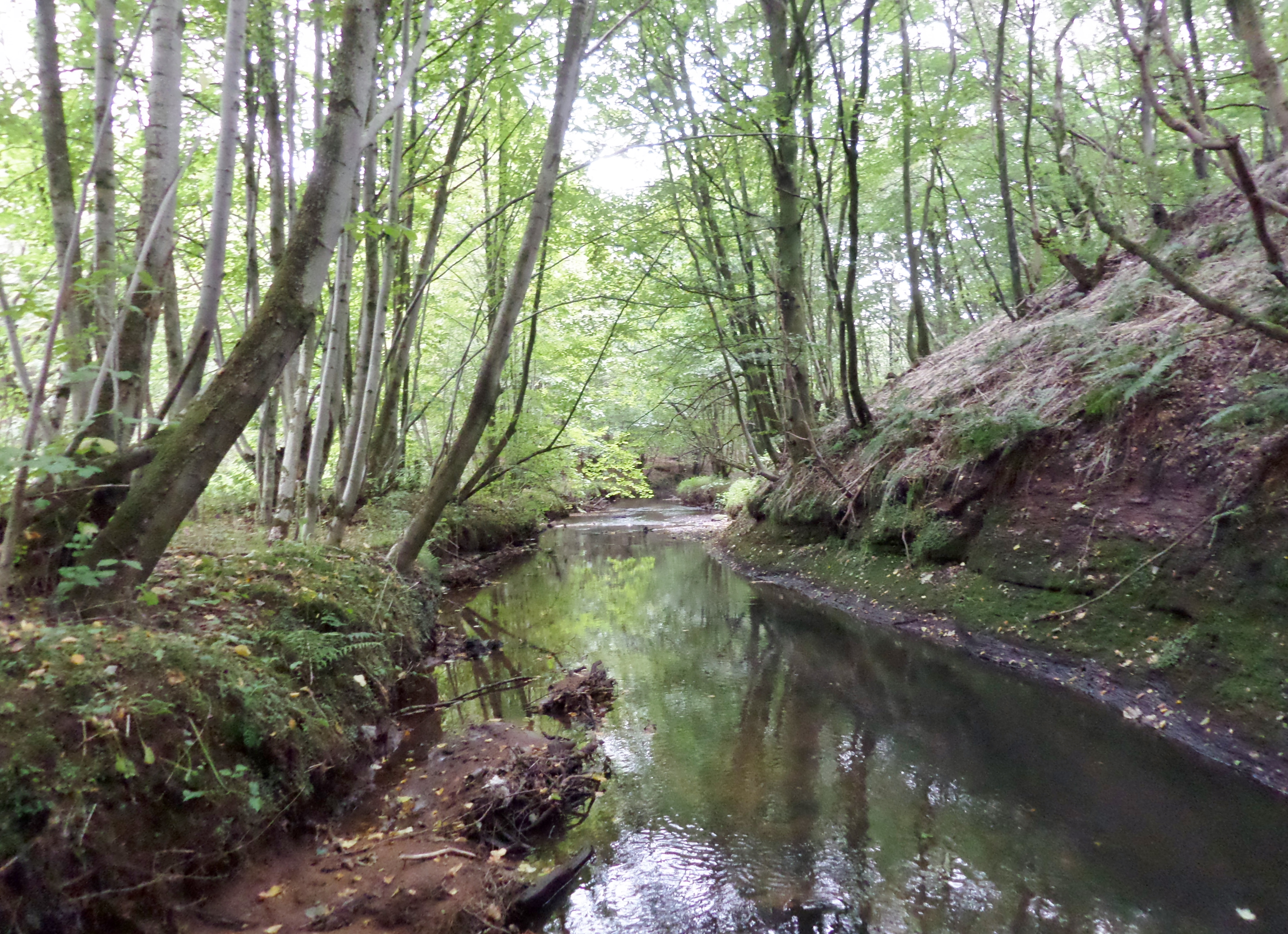
Deer come to drink at sheltered water courses and elricks often started at such points so that the animals could be driven from that area along the route that would lead to their point of capture.

In 1981 a section was excavated and was shown to consist of an earth bank only, likely to have been constructed on one single occasion. The turves used in its construction were taken from either side giving a width of 4.5 feet (1.4m) at the base with a maximum original height estimated at around 6.5 feet (2m). although both late Iron Age and medieval dating evidence was found it was not conclusive.

No one single feudal land holder is known to have controlled such a large area so its construction as an estate boundary is implausible, but a mediaeval head-dyke function or a deer hay wind function or a hunting forest demarcation fits the evidence better. It has been noted that a considerable number of similar earthworks exist in the vicinity of the dyke making interpretation a challenge.

The name 'Deil's Dyke' or 'Devil's Dyke' is commonly associated in myth and legend with structures of this scale however it has also been noted that a name similar or identical to 'Deil's Dyke' can mean a 'march dyke'.

Some of the gaps in the course of the dyke may be due to the historical presence of dense woodland. Areas of once extensive woodland in Nithsdale are indicated on old maps such as in the 1660s when a Cashogill Wood (sic) is recorded near Enterkinfoot, extending at least as far as Kilbryd Kirk (sic).

The RCAHMS have mapped sections of the Deil's Dyke near Morton Castle and near Gatelawbridge.

In the parish of Eskdalemuir are sections of another similar linear earthwork there known as the 'Deil's Jingle'.

== Function ==
Local tradition states that the dyke was used to hide cattle from raiders or to interfere with raiders returning with stolen sheep, cattle, horses and other goods, delaying them long enough for pursuers to catch up with them.

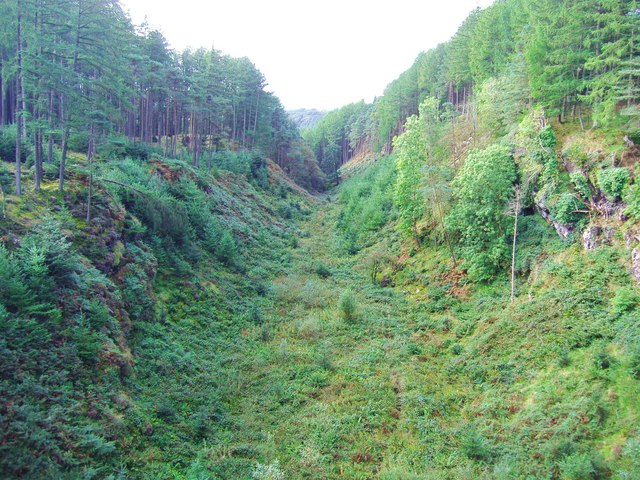
The Glen of the Bar elrick in Galloway is a natural feature once utilised for red deer management.

In a number of places along its route it has been utilised and modified or possibly originally built as a head-dyke which physically separated the arable lower lying land from the upland pastures which were grazed by sheep and cattle which would have otherwise eaten any arable crops. The terms 'in-field' and 'out-field' are sometimes applied and both are clearly marked on the landscape as green lush vegetation on lower lying land against the more complex colours of bare rock, heather, bracken, etc. on the moors or out-fields. The development of field boundaries meant that head-dykes were no longer necessary and they fell out of use in the 18th and 19th centuries.

The often erratic route may be explained by the need to enclose as much good quality arable land as possible.

The dyke has also been proposed as a tribal territorial boundary or as a medieval land boundary however the irregular course of this linear feature makes this unlikely.

The course of the Deil's Dyke is not noticeably associated with the many defensive features that exist in Nithsdale, such as Iron Age forts, medieval mottes, etc. although the linear earthwork near Durisdeer is linked with the site of the medieval castle.

The Catrail in Roxburghshire, southern Scotland, has a number of similarities with the Deil's Dyke and consists of a bank and a ditch and runs for 11.5 mi (18.5 km). It is considered to be a territorial land boundary dating from the Early Middle Ages and was once considered to link up with the Deil's Dyke.

Some deer hay winds or elricks may have consisted of banks and ditches several kilometres long that were used to direct deer for the purpose of capture and the Deil's Dyke fits this description. "Deer hunting has left physical traces on the landscape in the form of banks and dykes used either as park boundaries or for trapping the deer".

== The surveyed section of the New Cumnock to Durisdeer Parish route ==
In 1956 much of the route was walked and the following observations recorded -

a. NS 8000 0591 to NS 8260 0515: In 1985 this section had been removed by ploughing and was indistinguishable in other sections. Ardoch Farm and the A76 lie to the east.

b. NS 8000 0591 to NS 8005 0595: In 1978 this length consisted of a stone and earth bank, 0.5m high and 4m wide.

c. NS 8020 0601: In 1978 this section had a bank that on the north or downhill side enclosed an area of rig and furrow and lies close to the Hawkcleuch Burn.

d. NS 8027 0602: In 1978 modern drains obscured the junction and the bank was 0.4m hugh and 2m wide.

e. NS 8030 0603 to NS 8037 0602: In 1978 on the steep burn side slope the dyke was mostly obscured.

f. NS 8037 0602 to NS 8050 0600: The route was not possible to follow. A 230 yard gap may have existed if the OS route is ignored.

g. NS 8050 0600 to NS 8087 0596: In 1978 this section was hard to follow with minimal evidence. The Cowan Burn lies near by.

h. NS 8089 0597: No evidence of the route remained.

i. NS 8093 0596 to NS 8216 0579: The Dyke ran from the Cowan Burn to the northern side of Giengenny Hill.

j. NS 8093 0596 to NS 8150 0591: In 1978 little of the route remained.

k. NS 8150 0591 to NS 8213 0591: A contemporary wall runs along the route of the Dyke. The site is close to the Glengenny Burn.

l. NS 8213 0591 to NS 8266 0541: Arable land is taken in here and the dyke course was rather random.

m. NS 8216 0579 to NS 8272 0535: In 1956 this section had no fosse, but it did have a clearly visible bank, 6 ft-9 ft thick and up to 3 ft high.

n. NS 8258 0545: No sign of the dyke survived here.

o. NS 8266 0541 to NS 8272 0535: In 1978 This section had a clear profile, 2m wide and 0.7m high.

p. NS 8266 0541 to NS 8339 0500: Visible here in 1950.

q. NS 8268 0526: In 1978 the course was not discernible from more recent dykes.

r. NS 8272 0535: In 1956 the Dyke could be followed from the start of a sike tributary to Cubie's Cleuch.

s. NS 8272 0535 to NS 8298 0518: In 1978 the 2m wide bank of the dyke ran to the burn.

t. NS 8300 0518 to NS 8304 0511: Nothing remained of the dyke.

u. NS 8304 0511 to NS 8339 0500: A farm track had obscured the dyke's course.

v. NS 8404 0526: The dyke is thought to have started on the left bank of the Burnsands Burn in the area of its confluence with the River Nith.

== Cartographic evidence and place names ==
In 1328 Durisdeer was recorded as Durrysder which in Gaelic may derive from dubhros 'a dark wood' and doire 'an oak copse', literally the "dark wood of the oak copse." This description would be relevant in terms of the termination of a detached section of the Deil's Dyke in a wooded area.

As a common place name the name 'Deil' can mean the 'Devil' who together with the semi-mythological Picts were credited with building many unusual or megalithic structures; as previously stated it can also be a variant of a word meaning a march or head-dyke that divides or separate into one or more parts. The term 'Pict's Dyke' is mainly applied in the parish of Sanquhar.

Areas of once extensive woodland in Nithsdale indicated on old maps such as in the 1660s a Cashogill Wood (sic) is recorded near Enterkinfoot and extended as far as Kilbryd Kirk (sic). A 'Priest Wood' is recorded on a map of 1832 lying below the old church.

The March Cleugh is a small burn with a name meaning 'boundary' that flows from near Kirkbride Hill.

A March House stands near the dyke at Burnmouth and the name 'Eliock' is given to the nearby wood. The word 'Elerc' in Gaelic originally meant 'ambush' and later meant a 'deer trap' described as a funnel-like defile, artificial or natural into which deer were herded so that they could be contained and then killed. The personal or place name 'Elrick' is linked to such deer traps. A section of the dyke here is recorded by the RCAHMS in 1920 as having a foundation of large stones that indicate a width of seven feet.

== See also ==
- Catrail
- Devil's Dyke, Cambridgeshire
- Devil's Dyke, Hertfordshire
- Devil's Dyke, Sussex
- Devil's Dyke - Hungary, Romania and Serbia
- Carsphairn and Scaur Hills

== Bibliography and further reading ==
- Chalmers, George (1824). Caledonia: Or, An Account, Historical and Topographic, of North Britain. London: T. Cadell.
- Gilbert, J M. (1979). Hunting and hunting reserves in medieval Scotland. Edinburgh. RCAHMS Shelf Number: C.3.52.GIL
- Hewison, James King (1912). Dumfriesshire - Cambridge County Geographies. Cambridge: Cambridge University Press.
- Jackson, Kenneth H. (1972). The Gaelic Notes in the Book of Deer. London: Cambridge University Press.
- RCAHMS. (1920) The Royal Commission on the Ancient and Historical Monuments and Constructions of Scotland. Seventh report with inventory of monuments and constructions in the county of Dumfries. Edinburgh: HMSO.
- Taylor, Simon (2009). Ayrshire Place-Names: a rich seam still to mine. Ayrshire Notes. No. 38. ANHS.
- Wood, Rog (2010). Old Sanquhar Tales - A Collection of Folklore. Dumfries: Dumfries & Galloway Council. ISBN 978-1-899316-74-8.
