= Catrail =

Archaeological linear earthwork in Scotland

The Catrail is a linear earthwork in Roxburghshire, southern Scotland. It runs from Robert's Linn (55°18′56.7″N 2°43′47.56″W), a burn (stream) flowing into the Slitrig Water, westward and north-westward to the head of the Dean Burn (55°24′3.74″N 2°59′0.18″W), a tributary of the Borthwick Water. It is about 11.5 mi (18.5 km) long (as the crow flies), and consists of a ditch and bank. The Deil's Dyke was once considered to extend to the Catrail.

== Description ==
The Catrail is discontinuous and although the various sections are not fully aligned they are considered parts of a single structure on the grounds that the profile is similar from section to section. Between sections, the line generally seems to follow the courses of streams and rivers.

In profile, the earthwork consists of a ditch about 6–12 ft wide and 2–4.5 ft deep, and a parallel embankment about 8–13 ft wide and 2 ft high. There is generally a lesser bank running along the other side of the ditch which is quite wide but only a few inches high. The main bank is on the north-east side of the ditch.

The Catrail cuts across the upper Teviot valley, separating the low-lying farmland to the north-east around Hawick in Teviotdale from the hillier up-river country to the south-west.

== Interpretation ==
It is not known when or by whom the Catrail was made, or for what purpose. However, since it is not substantial enough to be an effective military barrier, it seems likely to have been a territorial boundary marker, possibly dating from the Early Middle Ages.

The philosopher, poet and historian John Veitch undertook a survey of the Catrail in the late 19th Century and devoted a chapter to it in his History and Poetry of the Scottish Border, Volume 1 (1893). He believed that it had been constructed early in 7th Century to mark the south-eastern boundary of the territory held by the Strathclyde Britons.
