= Margaret Maxwell Inglis =

Scottish poet

- Born: 27 October 1774; Sanquhar, Dumfriesshire, Scotland
- Died: 21 December 1843 (aged 69); Edinburgh, Scotland
- Occupation: Poet
- Writing career
- Genre: Poetry

Margaret Maxwell Inglis (née Murray; 27 October 1774 – 21 December 1843) was a Scottish poet commended by Robert Burns.

== Biography ==
Margaret Inglis was born on 27 October 1774 at Sanquhar, Dumfriesshire, was daughter of Dr. Alexander Murray. Her literary and musical gifts were developed by a good education. When very young she was married to a Mr. Finlay, who was in the navy, and who soon died in the West Indies. After some years at home with her relatives, Mrs. Finlay, in 1803, became the wife of John Inglis, son of the parish minister of Kirkmabreck in East Galloway, and an officer in the excise.

On his death in 1826, his widow and three children had to depend solely on a small annuity devolving from his office. Mrs. Inglis now studied hard, and wrote much, publishing in 1828 Miscellaneous Collection of Poems, chiefly Scriptural Pieces. These are, according to the Dictionary of National Biography, generally spirited and graceful in expression. One of the lyrics is a memorial tribute to James Hogg, the Ettrick Shepherd, whose style Mrs. Inglis frequently followed with considerable success.

She died in Edinburgh on 21 December 1843. According to Rogers' Scottish Minstrel, Robert Burns commended her for her exquisite rendering of his songs, especially Ca' the yowes to the knowes.

== Notes ==
This article incorporates text from a publication now in the public domain: Bayne, Thomas Wilson (1892). "Inglis, Margaret Maxwell". In Lee, Sidney (ed.). Dictionary of National Biography. Vol. 29. London: Smith, Elder & Co.
