= Sanquhar Castle =

Castle ruins in Scotland

Coordinates: 55°21′44″N 3°55′06″W

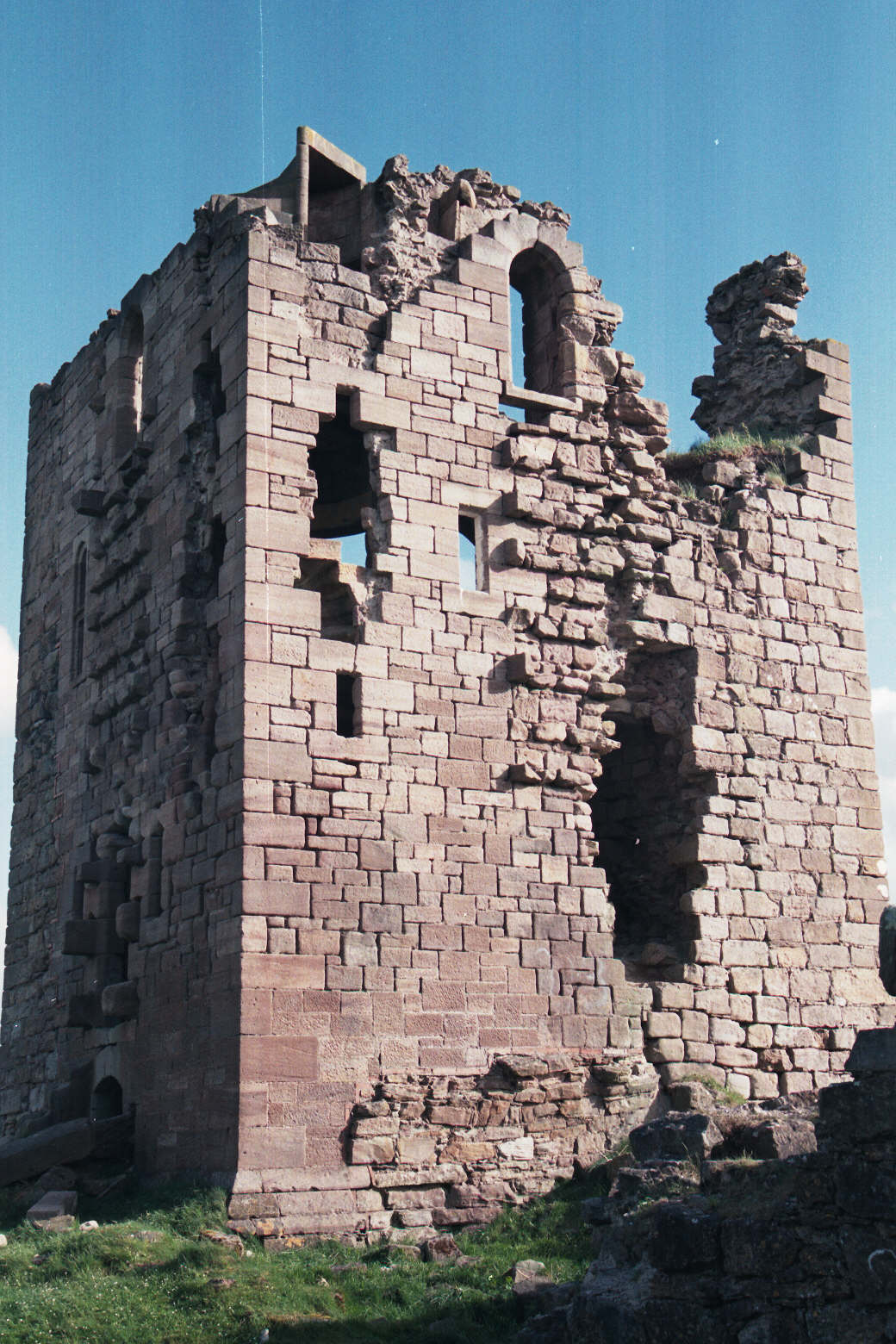
Ruined tower of Sanquhar Castle

Sanquhar Castle, now a ruin, was built in the 13th century; the ruins are situated north east of Dumfries overlooking the River Nith. Situated on the southern approach to the former royal burgh of Sanquhar in Dumfries and Galloway, south west Scotland, it sits on the trail of the Southern Upland Way. The castle is a stronghold bounded on the west by the River Nith, to the north by a burn, and made strong by a deep ditch running the remainder of the boundary.

== History ==
The castle was built by the Ross family in the 13th century and then passed to the Crichton family in the 14th century. In July 1617, James VI and I, visited the castle en route to Glasgow: the Crichtons welcomed him with a display so huge that it bankrupted them. Sanquhar Castle was sold by the Crichtons in the mid 17th century to Sir William Douglas, 1st Duke of Queensberry, who established the fairytale pink sandstone Drumlanrig Castle ten miles south of Sanquhar near Thornhill. From then on the castle at Sanquhar began to steadily crumble to a ruin, until 1895 when John Crichton-Stuart, 3rd Marquess of Bute, purchased it and attempted to enthuse a restoration of his ancestral home, following successful restorations at Cardiff Castle and Castell Coch in Wales. This was undertaken by Robert Weir Schultz and the squarer and more structurally sound sections rebuilt at that time can clearly be identified.

Work ended following the death of the Marquess in 1900, and what is left of the site is a mix of restoration and original stonework, but still very far from any sense of completion. It is designated a scheduled monument.
