= Sanquhar =

Market town in Scotland

Coordinates: 55.36793°N 3.92463°W

Sanquhar: Scottish Gaelic: Seanchair; Scots: Sanchar
- Market town and former royal burgh
- Sanquhar Tolbooth Sanquhar Castle Post Office Crawick Multiverse Mennock Pass

- Location within Dumfries and Galloway
- Population: 1,913 (2022)
- Language: English; Southern Scots
- OS grid reference: NS781099
- Council area: Dumfries and Galloway
- Lieutenancy area: Dumfriesshire
- Country: Scotland
- Sovereign state: United Kingdom
- Post town: SANQUHAR
- Postcode district: DG4
- Dialling code: 01659
- Police: Scotland
- Fire: Scottish
- Ambulance: Scottish
- UK Parliament: Dumfriesshire, Clydesdale and Tweeddale
- Scottish Parliament: Dumfriesshire

Sanquhar /ˈsæŋkər/ (Scots: Sanchar, Scottish Gaelic: Seanchair) is a historic market town and former royal burgh on the River Nith in Dumfries and Galloway, Scotland, north of Thornhill and west of Moffat. The town is approximately 49 miles (79 km) southwest of Edinburgh, 36 miles (58 km) southeast of Glasgow, and 24 miles (38 km) north-northwest of Dumfries. It had a population of 1,913 in 2022.

It is notable for its tiny post office, established in 1712 and considered the oldest working post office in the world. It was also where the Covenanters, who opposed episcopalisation of the church, signed the Sanquhar Declaration renouncing their allegiance to the King, an event commemorated by a monument in the main street.

The church of St Bride's contains a memorial to James Crichton, a 16th-century polymath. The ruins of Sanquhar Castle stand nearby. Nithsdale Wanderers, the local football team, were formed in 1897. In 1924–25, they won the Scottish Division Three.

The town celebrates the granting of its Royal Charter on the 3rd Saturday in August each year. The day consists of a procession of horses, decorated floats and massed pipes and drums around the town.

== History ==
The name "Sanquhar" comes from the Scottish Gaelic language An t-Seanchair, meaning "old fort". A 15th-century castle ruin overlooks the town, but the name predates even this ancient fort. The antiquary, William Forbes Skene even considered it the probable location of the settlement named Corda in Ptolemy's Geographia.

The ancient hill fort at Tynron Doon is located about 28 kilometres away from the town. This fort is described in Archaeology of late Celtic Britain and Ireland by L R Laing (1975) as "a well-preserved multivallate hillfort" which probably began its existence in the Iron Age and continued to be used throughout the Dark Ages and into the early Medieval period. During Roman times the fort would have been in Selgovae territory; after the Romans departed it lay on the borders of the Strathclyde Britons and the Galwyddel. This place is associated with a local legend of a "heidless horseman" who is supposed to have ridden down from it as an omen of death, a story which possibly has some origin in a Celtic head cult. The Poetical Works of Sir Walter Scott (1822) attest that Robert the Bruce hid in the forests about this hill after he had killed one of his rivals, John "the Red" Comyn.

In the 9th and 10th centuries, waves of Gaelic settlers came to the area from Ireland. These Scoto-Irish people replaced the native Britons and became the dominant inhabitants for hundreds of years. In the 12th century, Norman colonization of the British Isles brought a feudal system of government and barons and sheriffs ruled the land for several centuries. In around 1213, Walter Stewart, 3rd High Steward of Scotland, made a grant of timber from the forest of Sanquhar for the construction of Paisley Priory.

From the late 13th Century, the border counties were often in a state of turmoil as groups raided each other across the dividing lines. During the war of Scottish Independence the English army took over the old castle at Sanquhar. The Lord of the Castle, Sir William the Hardy, Lord of Douglas, learned of this and came up with a clever plot where one man sneaked into the castle and threw open the gates, allowing Lord Douglas to seize it. The English began a counter-attack, but William Wallace learned of the battle and came to the rescue. As the English army retreated, Wallace chased them down and killed 500 of them. Wallace visited the castle on several occasions.

=== Crichton family ===
During the reign of Robert the Bruce the Crichton family obtained the lands round about Sanquhar and ruled over the area from the mid-14th until the mid-17th centuries. Mary, Queen of Scots, (cousin of Queen Elizabeth the 1st) came to Sanquhar in May 1568 after her defeat at the battle of Langside. Lord Crichton of Sanquhar was loyal to Mary, and harboured her until she escaped across the River Nith.

The end of the Crichton family power in the area was the result of a lavish party. In July 1617, the King of Great Britain, James VI and I, travelled through Scotland to Glasgow, and on his way home stopped at the castle in Sanquhar. The Crichtons welcomed him with a display so huge that it bankrupted them. It is said that Lord Crichton escorted the king to bed carrying a lighted torch made from £30,000 in bond notes that the king owed Lord Crichton. By 1639, the Crichtons had moved to Ayrshire, and sold their holdings in Sanquhar to the Earl of Queensberry.

A joke in the region is that many a young woman who worked for the Crichtons would "Go in the servants' entrance and come out the family way". However, one well-regarded member of Crichton family was James Crichton (known as 'The Admirable Crichton').

=== Religious upheaval ===
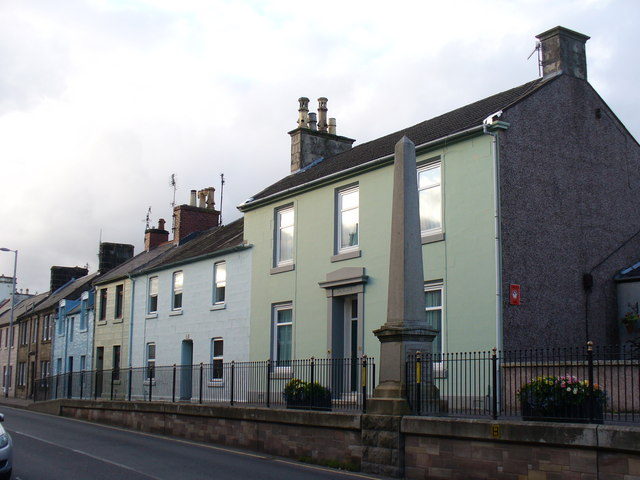
The Sanquhar Declarations Monument

Sanquhar was a hotbed of unrest during the Covenanting period. With its position as the only major town in a large area, and situated by the River Nith, it seemed that whenever any remarkable political movement was going on people would go to Sanquhar to proclaim their testimonies on the subject. It was here, in 1680, that Richard Cameron, with a band of armed supporters, posted on the town cross the first declaration of Sanquhar renouncing allegiance to Charles II.

The year 1685 saw the second declaration, by James Renwick, who also took a large armed party into Sanquhar, frightening all the townspeople who thought a battle was coming. The Sanquhar Declarations, as they are known, set forth the basis of religious freedom in Scotland.

In the Victorian period the town's mercat cross was transformed into a monument bearing the inscription: In commemoration of the two famous Sanquhar Declarations, which were published on this spot, where stood the ancient Cross of the Burgh; the one by the Rev. Richard Cameron, on 22 June 1680; the other by the Rev. James Renwick, on 25 May 1685, during the Killing Time.

The end of the Covenanting period in the early 18th century was not the last religious upheaval for the area. The Church of Scotland was torn by several disputes over the years. One of the major issues was whether the local populations or church headquarters could hire local ministers. In the 1830s many churches seceded and in 1843 a large number of churches broke away to form the Free Church of Scotland. The time was known as the “Great Disruption”. In Sanquhar the minister joined the splinter group in 1843.

=== Later history ===
In the 1780s, the legendary Scottish poet Robert Burns was a frequent visitor to Sanquhar. When he was renovating a farm in 1788, he often passed through on the way back to his wife, Jean, in Ayrshire. Afterwards, he became a well-known face because of his excise duties. Burns called the town "Black Joan" in his ballad "Five Carlins" in which he represented the local burghs as characters. He would stay overnight at the Queensberry Arms in the High Street, making friends with the owner, bailie Edward Whigham and calling it "the only tolerable Inn in the place".

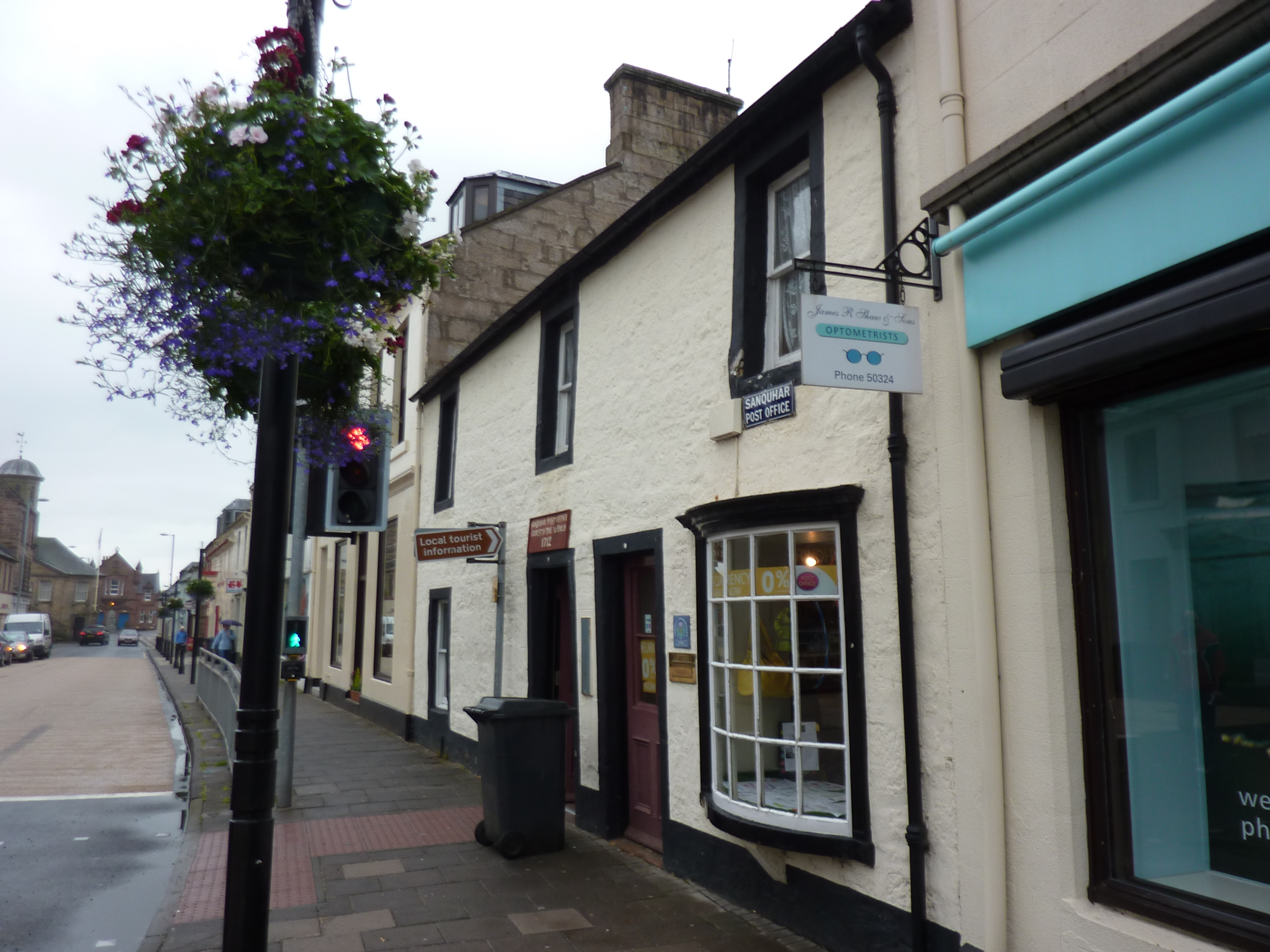
The oldest Post Office in the world

Sanquhar is notable for its tiny post office and held to be the oldest working post office in the world. Established in 1712, its closest rival is a post office in Stockholm, Sweden which opened in 1720. In 2019 it was put up for sale and was finally bought by new owners, the 17th in its operating history, in 2023.

The wool trade had been an important one in the coastal trading towns of Dumfriesshire and Kirkcudbright since medieval times and by the 18th century Sanquhar had developed as an inland market centre. The Sanquhar Wool Fair, held in July, regulated the prices for the whole south of Scotland. A distinctive two-coloured pattern of knitting which is widely known as 'Sanquhar knitting' takes its name from this small parish. A traveller's account early in the 18th century tells us: 'Gloves they make better and cheaper than in England, for they send great quantities thither.' Many a poor farm family supported themselves with extra income from these sought-after knitted garments. While knitting died out as an industry, the presentation of traditional Sanquhar gloves is an important part of local celebrations even today. Sanquhar resident, May MacCormick, has written down numerous glove designs many of which had not been previously recorded. Incorporating the owner's initials into the cuff to personalise the gloves is part of the tradition.

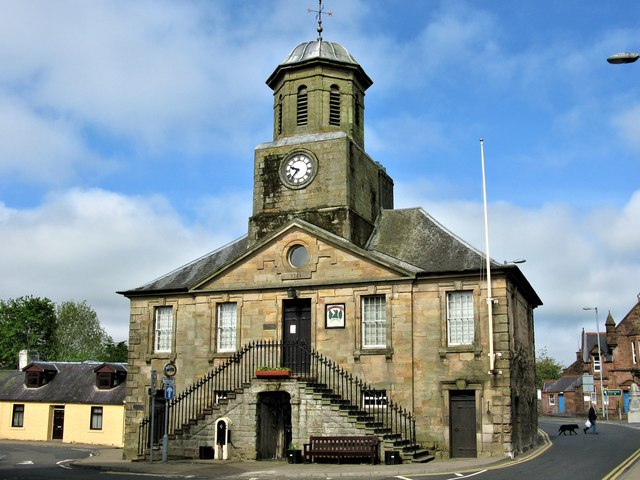
Sanquhar Tolbooth

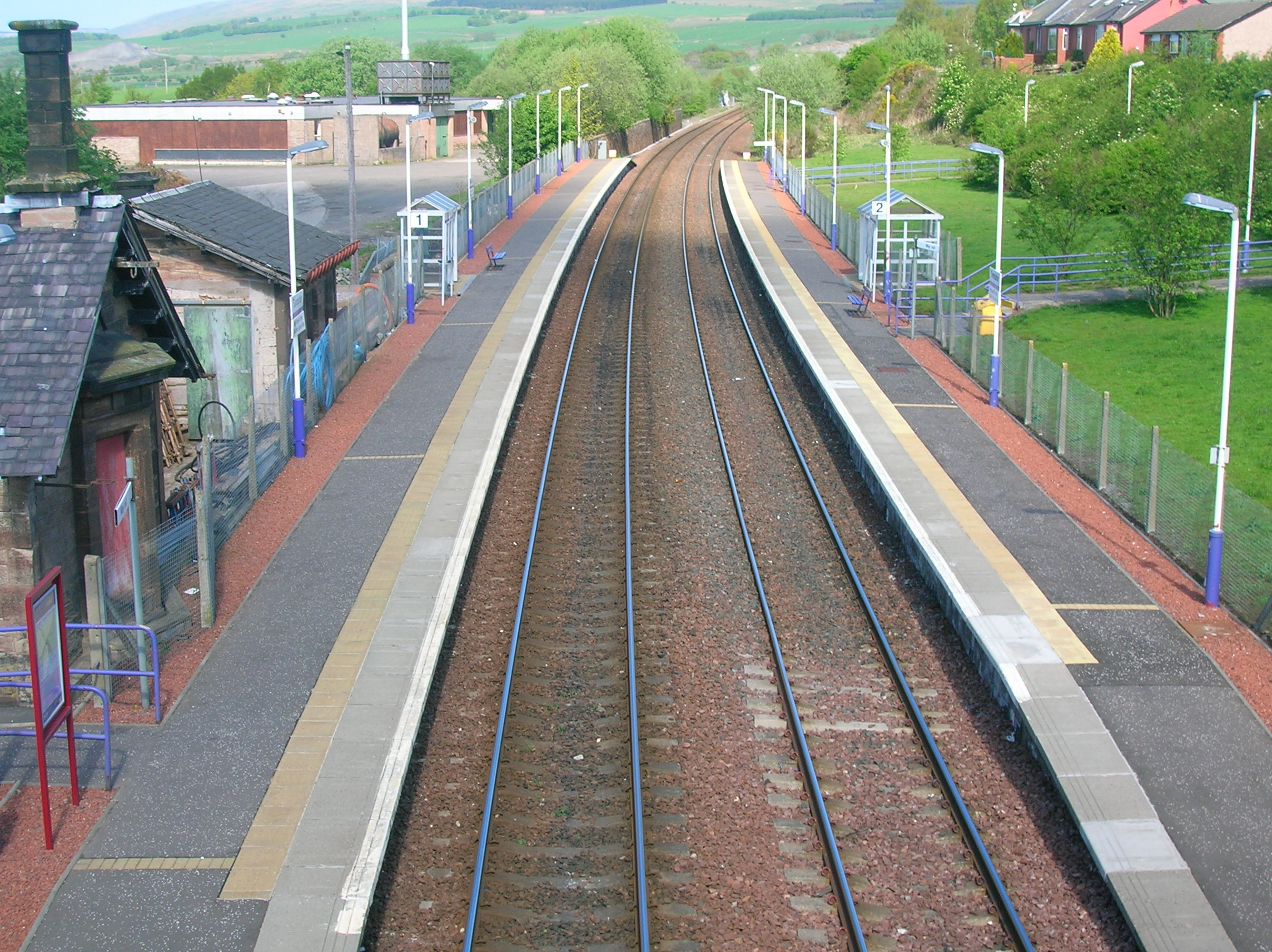
The re-opened Sanquhar station from the roadbridge looking towards Kirkconnel. 2007.

The decline of traditional industries hurt the town, but now new manufacturers are moving in and there is a strong sense of community in the burgh. William Adam, a famous Scottish architect, designed Sanquhar Tolbooth in the centre of town, which is the only surviving building of this type designed by him. Completed in 1739, much of the building materials for it were taken from the old castle in Sanquhar and it is currently used as the town museum, containing local artifacts and memorabilia.

The town has the world's oldest curling society, formed in 1774 with sixty members. James Brown, who wrote an important history of the town, is also credited with writing the rules universally used for the sport.

The population of the town at the time of the 1841 census was 1,638 inhabitants.

The railway line has remained open for freight and passenger traffic, however Sanquhar railway station was closed and only re-opened in recent years.

=== Crawick Village ===
Other work came in the form of a carpet factory, along the Crawick Water. At first, it consisted of a few separate looms, but by the 1830s, there was a large factory, boasting 54 looms at its height. The carpets made here were world-renowned for their durability and orders came from as far away as South America. A large proportion of their total production was shipped to Valparaíso, Chile.

The location along the Crawick River was also the home of John Rigg's forge. In the late 18th century, he had been persuaded to move here from Dalston in Cumbria to supply tools for the coalfields. He made a damhead opposite the village of Crawick and used the water to power his factory. The water separated the parishes of Sanquhar and Kirkconnel, and although the forge was on the Kirkconnel side, Sanquhar always laid claim to it. The forge produced shovels and other tools into the 20th century.

The village of Crawick had once been known as a haven for witches. One story is that the parish minister's cows began making milk that would not churn. He sent one of his servants to tie a branch from a rowan tree over the doorway of the witch's house in Crawick, which ended the curse. For a long time, a large rowan tree flourished in the front yard of the church, perhaps partly to keep these evil spirits away. Life in Crawick was described beautifully by James Brown, in his History of Sanquhar:

“Crawick Mill was a clean tidy little hamlet pleasantly embosomed on the banks of the Crawick and sheltered from almost every wind that blew, and there was no happier colony of weavers to be found in any country district in Scotland. They were almost all natives, whose whole life associations were connected with the place. We have no pleasanter memory than that of the weavers playing quoits, of which they were very fond, on the summer evenings on the "Alley", a long strip of ground on the banks of the stream behind the Village, while their wives, with their clean "mutches" sat about or sauntered up and down chatting and gossiping, and the bairns were either scrambling along the wooded banks of the Crawick or "paidling" in its clear water, the pleasant babble of the stream as it rushed over the dam-head mingling with the voices of the men at their game and the joyous shouts and laughter of the children.”

== Cycling history ==
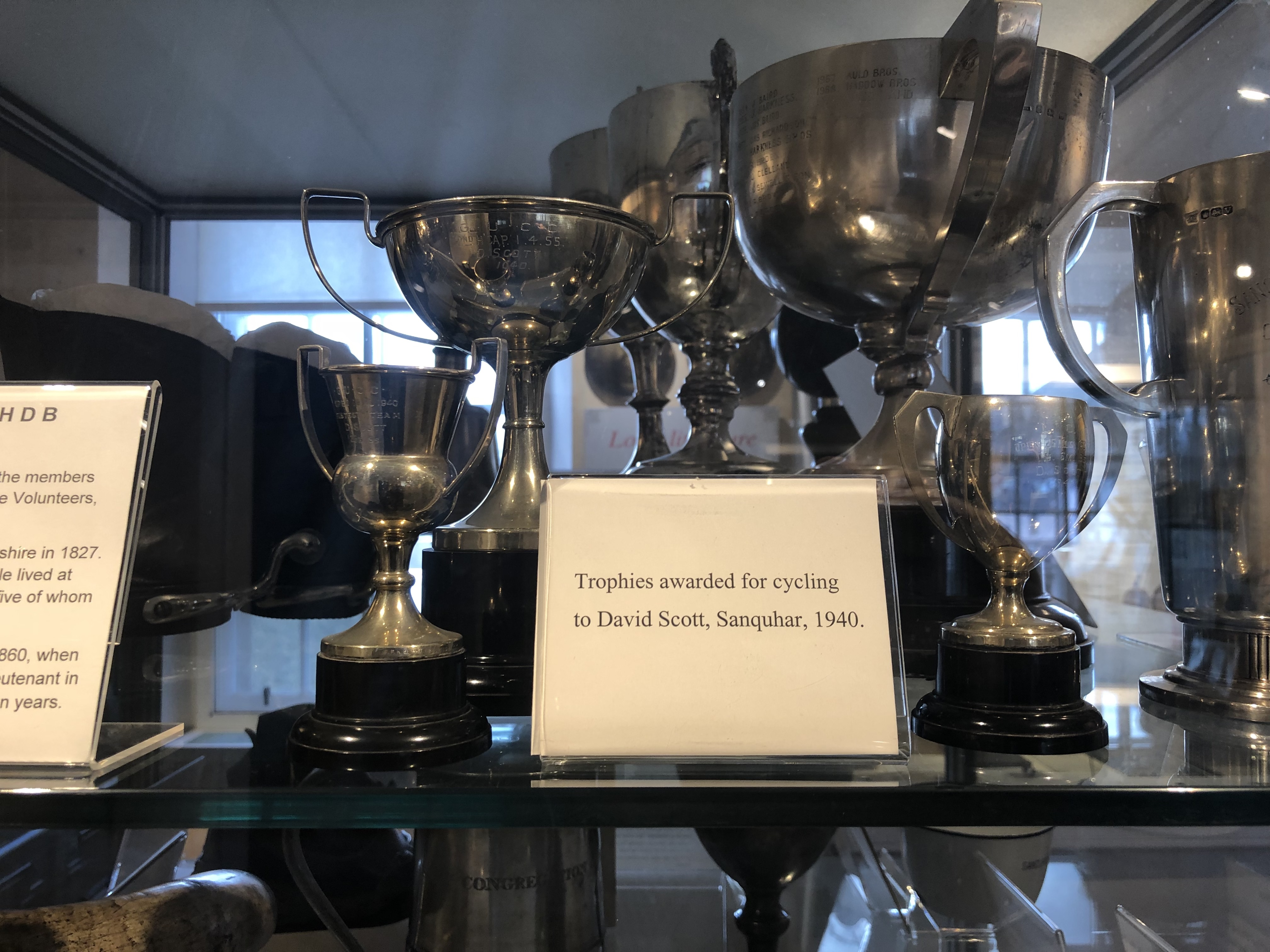
Cycling Trophies awarded to Dave Scott of Crawick Wheelers

In the late 1930s, Sanquhar was the home to Crawick Wheelers, a very successful Cycling Club which was instrumental in the setting of a number of Scottish Time Trial records. The Scott brothers were prolific in setting these records along with Jock Tudhope. The Scotts were predominantly miners in the local collieries and worked an 11-day fortnight finishing work on a Saturday morning. They would then ride from Sanquhar to Dundee or Perth and take part in Time Trial races before returning home on the Sunday. After the 1939-45 war, Jim Scott moved on from Crawick Wheelers and rode for Law Wheelers in Lanarkshire; the Crawick club seems to have folded at around this time. The records set were as follows:

=== 25-mile (40 km) records ===
1939 W.Scott Crawick Wheelers 1 h 01 min 21 s

1940 W.Scott Crawick Wheelers 1 h 00 min 54 s

1944 D.Scott Crawick Wheelers 59 min 55 s

1949 J.Scott Law Wheelers 59 min 40 s

1950 J.Scott Law Wheelers 59 min 37 s

1952 J.Scott Law Wheelers 59 min 11 s

The 1944 time set by Dave Scott was the first time a Scottish rider had posted a time of less than 1 hour for the 25-mile (40 km) distance.

=== 25-mile (40 km) Team Records ===
1950 Law Wheelers: J. Scott, A. Williams & A. Hamilton, 3 h 01 min 39 s

=== 30-Mile Records ===
1939 W. Scott (Crawick Wheelers), 1 h 13 min 59 s

1950 J. Scott (Law Wheelers), 1 h 13 min 22 s

The 30-mile (48 km) record set by Bill Scott stood for 11 years before being beaten by his brother Jim.

=== 30-mile (48 km) Team Records ===
1943 Crawick Wheelers: D. Scott, J. Scott & J. Tudhope, 3 h 50 min 56 s

=== 50-mile (80 km) Records ===
1939 W. Scott (Crawick Wheelers), 2 h 04 min 52 s

1944 J. Tudhope (Crawick Wheelers), 2 h 04 min 50 s

1949 J. Scott (Law Wheelers), 2 h 02 min 45 s

=== 50-mile (80 km) Team Records ===
1944 Crawick Wheelers: J. Tudhope, D. Scott & J. McKay, 6 h 30 min 27 s

A number of cycling trophies won by Dave Scott are on display in the Sanquhar Tollbooth Museum.

== Local festivities ==
The town celebrates the granting of its Royal Charter on the 3rd Saturday in August each year. The day consists of a procession of horses, decorated floats and massed pipes and drums around the town. The town also celebrated 100 years of Riding the Marches in 2010.

== Neighbouring hills ==
Sanquhar sits in Nithsdale in close proximity to ranges of interesting hills on either side, the Carsphairn and Scaur range to the west and the Lowther hills to the south east. These hills offer excellent possibilities for the outdoor enthusiast. The Southern Upland Way passes through the town on its way from Portpatrick on Scotland's west coast to Cockburnspath on the east.

== Notable people ==
- James Bell (1836-1908) - Businessman and politician was born in the town.
- Margaret Maxwell Inglis (1774-1843) - poet
- John Dickson Wyselaskie (1818-1883) - Australian pastoralist and philanthropist was born in the town.

== See also ==
- Holm House and the Crawick Glen
- Deil's Dyke - A linear earthwork.
- List of places in Dumfries and Galloway
- Sanquhar railway station
- Mennock
- Mennock Lye Goods Depot
- Kirkbride, Durisdeer
