= Carsphairn and Scaur Hills =

Hills in Scotland

Coordinates: 55.217°N 4.0170°W

The Carsphairn and Scaur Hills are the western and eastern hills respectively of a hill range in the Southern Uplands of Scotland. Ordnance Survey maps don't have a general name for the hill area as a whole. Also, Ordnance Survey use "Scar" rather than the local spelling of "Scaur" - the word is pronounced as "Scar" however. In their Landranger Series of maps, it requires four separate sheets to cover the area.

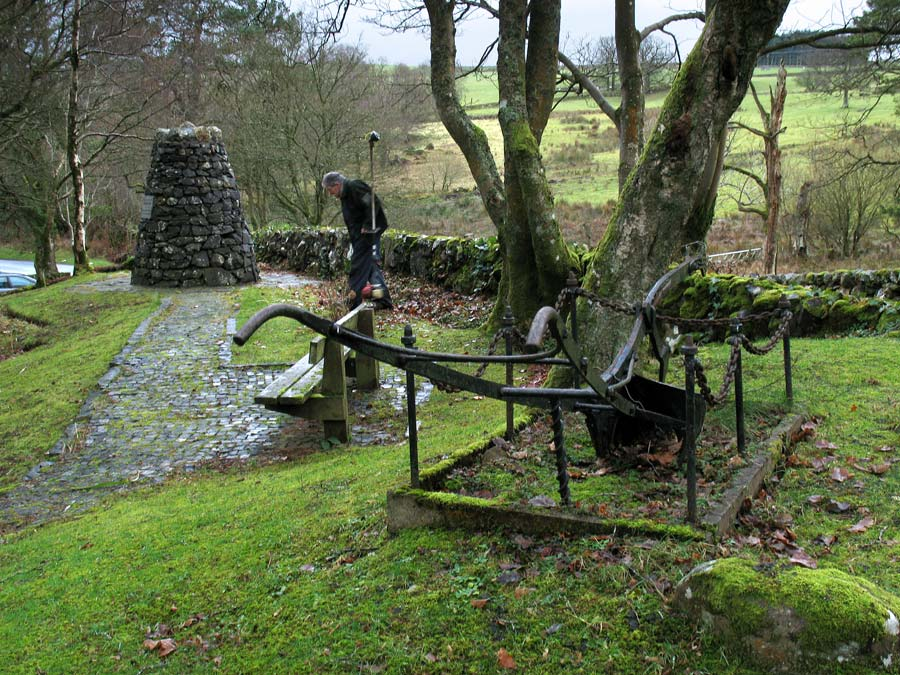
The Burns Cairn in Glen Afton. The inscription on the cairn says "Flow Gently Sweet Afton. Robert Burns 1759–1796. Erected by New Cumnock Burns Club (500) to mark its golden jubilee 1973."

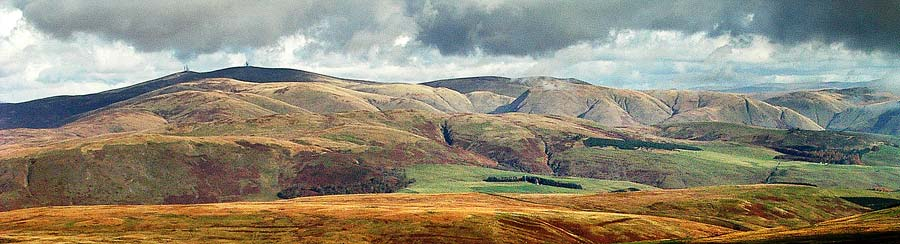
Looking east across Nithsdale to the Lowther Hills - from Cairnkinna.

== Location ==
The range lies between two other ranges, the Galloway Hills to the west and the Lowther Hills to the east. The overall shape of this hill area is oval with the longer curved sides to top and bottom. From the north western point of the oval at Dalmellington to the south eastern point at Thornhill is around 39 kilometres (as the crow flies), though Dalmellington lies some 10 kilometres further north than Thornhill. So the axis of the oval runs from north west to south east. Taking a section across the west end of the oval, from New Cumnock in the north to Carsphairn in the south it is over 19 kilometres and on the east a similar cross section from Sanquhar to Moniaive is almost the same (19 kilometres). The north west quarter of the oval lies in Ayrshire in Strathclyde Region and the other three quarters are in Dumfries and Galloway.

By comparison with the Galloway and Lowther Hills, Carsphairn and Scaur Hills are much less frequented or known about except by the local populace - for whom the hills have a special place in the folk memories. As there are also many more communities immediately around these hills, the naming of this area would be challenged strongly by local communities who would each wish to claim them for their own.

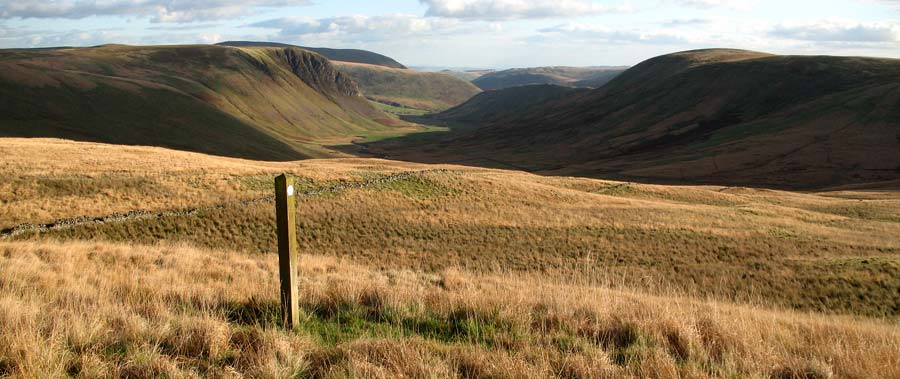
Scaur Glen from Cloud Hill near Polgown on the Southern Upland Way - looking south east with Weltrees Hill on the left then Glenwhargen Craig. Cairnkinna is the dark silhouette beyond these on the skyline and Black Rig (catching the light) is in front of it. Peat Hill is the hill on the right of the picture. The post in the foreground is one of the SUW way markers

=== The Northern Boundary ===
From Dalmellington, the B741 runs north east to New Cumnock passing the head waters of the River Nith on the way. At New Cumnock, this road joins the A76 which follows the valley of the Nith eastward through the former coal mining towns of Kirkconnel and Sanquhar before swinging southward to Thornhill. The northern boundary therefore follows the River Nith for all but some 5 kilometres. The A76 carries on from there southward with the River Nith to the town of Dumfries.

=== The Southern Boundary ===
From Thornhill the boundary is formed by the A702 road which travels south west through the small villages of Penpont and Moniaive. From Moniaive the A702 continues in a south westerly direction towards St. John's Town of Dalry and New Galloway, but the boundary of our hill area follows the B729 westward towards Carsphairn on a largely single track road. At Carsphairn the B729 joins the A713 heading north-westward for Dalmellington.

== River Systems ==
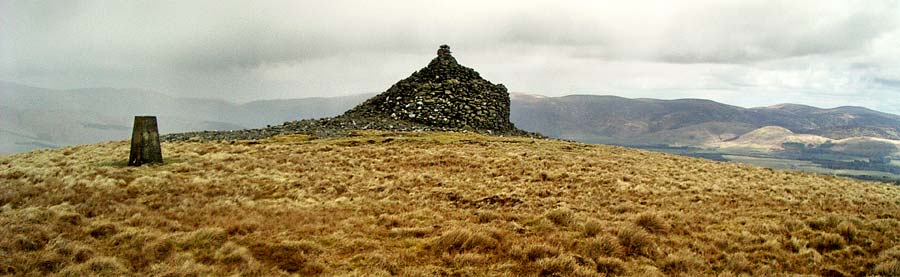
Trig point and spiral cairn on top of Cairnkinna with a squall coming in from the Lowthers.

Blacklorg Hill lies roughly in the centre of this hill area with the Afton Reservoir just to the west of it. The main rivers radiate out from this central area in all directions. Below is a list of the main water courses starting from Water of Ken and following a clockwise order round the various waters.

=== Water of Ken ===
Water of Ken rises just to the south east of the watershed at Polskeoch; less than a kilometre from the head waters of Scaur Water on the other side of the watershed. It heads in a generally southern direction and joins the Water of Deugh some 2.5 kilometres north of Kendoon power station which is the second in a series of such power stations running all the way down through the Glenkens from Drumjohn near Loch Doon (which is used as a reservoir for the system and whose level was raised by 27 feet by damming in the 1930s) to Tongland near Kirkcudbright. This series of power stations is called Galloway hydro-electric power scheme. The next two power stations are at Carsfad Loch and Earlstoun Loch with Water of Ken running through them to the fourth power station at Glenlee (1 kilometre south west of St John's Town of Dalry) and onward as far as Parton village (where James Clerk Maxwell is buried) on Loch Ken, where it is subsumed into the River Dee. The southern end of Loch Ken is shown with the alternative title of River Dee on the Ordnance Survey maps. River Dee itself starts from Loch Dee as Black Water of Dee. It runs through Clatteringshaws Loch where in the 1930s a dam was placed on it to form another reservoir for the Galloway hydro-electric power scheme. From Loch Ken the River Dee flows south past Threave Castle (which is on an island in the river) and into Kirkcudbright Bay and thence into the Solway Firth.

=== Dalwhat Water ===
This water runs south eastward to Moniaive close to which it meets the conjoined waters of Craigdarroch and Castlefairn Waters and becomes the River Cairn. The Cairn in turn is subsumed into the River Nith just outside Dumfries.

=== Shinnel Water ===
Shinnel Water runs south eastward, through the village of Tynron. It joins the Scaur Water just west of Penpont. The Scaur Water is subsumed into the River Nith some 3 kilometres south of Thornhill.

=== Scaur Water ===
This water rises near Polskeoch close to the source of the Water of Ken so that these two water systems taken together create a natural route through the south east corner of these hills and the roads which run up into these glens almost meet - there is a gap of some 2 kilometres with no road between Lorg on Water of Ken and Polskeoch on the Polskeoch Burn (which feeds Scaur Water). Scaur Water travels in a generally south eastward direction to Penpont.

=== Euchan Water and the Kello Water ===
These waters rise within a kilometre of each other on the north east side of Blacklorg Hill. They both run north-eastward, the Euchan (pronounced 'Yochan') being subsumed into the River Nith just south of Sanquhar (close by the ruin of Sanquhar Castle) and the Kello into it at Kelloholm 1 kilometre east of Kirkconnel.

=== Afton Water ===
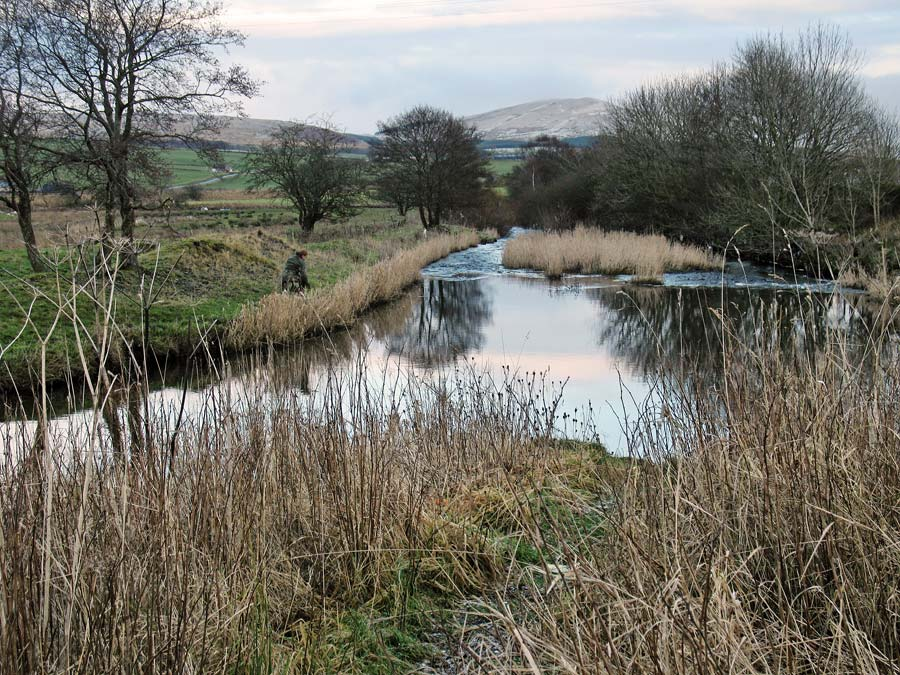
Looking south towards the River Nith at the point where it is joined by Afton Water just north of New Cumnock. The water entering from the bottom left of the picture is the River Nith and the water entering from the right is Afton Water. The hill in the background is Corsencon Hill (475 metres). Cumnock Castle stood on this site in the Middle Ages.

Afton Water rises south of the Afton Reservoir. It flows north through the reservoir and then through New Cumnock before being subsumed into the River Nith just north of New Cumnock where Cumnock Castle once stood. The Afton has been made famous by Robert Burns' song "Flow Gently Sweet Afton" and the Burns connection adds an extra dimension to the pride in their countryside of the local populace.

=== River Nith ===
The River Nith rises about a kilometre south west of Enoch Hill. It flows northward under the B741 at Nith Lodge roughly halfway between Dalmellington and New Cumnock before swinging eastward. From New Cumnock it forms the boundary between the Lowther Hills and Carsphairn/Scaur Hills. The A76 travels down the valley created by it (Nithsdale). Just north of Thornhill is Drumlanrig Castle belonging to the Duke of Buccleuch.

=== Water of Deugh ===
This water rises to the west of Afton Reservoir. It joins Carsphairn Lane just west of Carsphairn village and is subsumed into Water of Ken north of Kendoon. As part of the Galloway hydro-electric power scheme, when rainfall is plentiful, water is diverted into Loch Doon from the Water of Deugh (pronounced 'Dyooch') via a tunnel system. When water is required for power generation, water from Loch Doon is then released at Drumjohn to feed Kendoon power station.

== Access to Scaur Hills ==
=== From the North ===
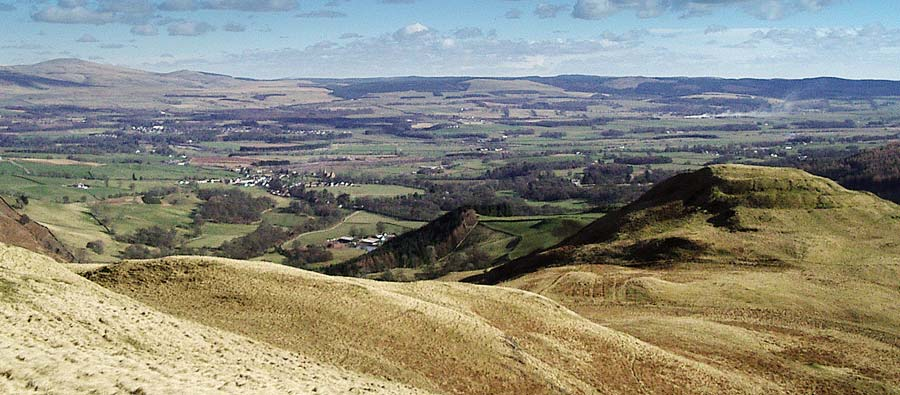
Looking east from Auchengibbert Hill with Tynron Doon in the right foreground with the valley of the River Nith (Nithsdale) beyond. The village of Penpont is in the near foreground with Thornhill in the middle distance and Queensberry Hill by the left edge of the picture. Wee Queensberry is the smaller hill to the right (south) of it).

From Sanquhar the Southern Upland Way (SUW) heads south west over gently rising moorland, before descending to Scaur Water at Polgown from whence it uses the minor road which follows Scaur Water to Polskeoch where there is a Mountain Bothies Association bothy (OS Ref NS685018). From there the SUW heads south to St John's Town of Dalry.

Coming in from the area of Mennock village, the route is again over rising moorland called Fardingmulloch Moor. Beyond that the route continues on an old track over by Druidhill Burn to Scaur Water and Penpont. this could have been an ancient way through these hills, since the route passes a fine earthwork by the Druidhill Burn (OS Ref NS810014).

=== From the East ===
To the east of this ancient way from Mennock to Penpont the hills drop to a small glen which carries a minor road north from Penpont to Burnmouth on the River Nith. There are several places along this glen offering access into the Scaur hills. Drumlanrig castle, its grounds, and the many estate properties surrounding it lie on and around a low north–south carefully forested ridge between this glen and the west bank of the River Nith. There are several walking and cycling trails in these wood and river bank environs. This is good agricultural land and there are many minor roads through the low green hills serving the farming community in this most easterly part of the Scaur hills.

=== From the South and South East ===
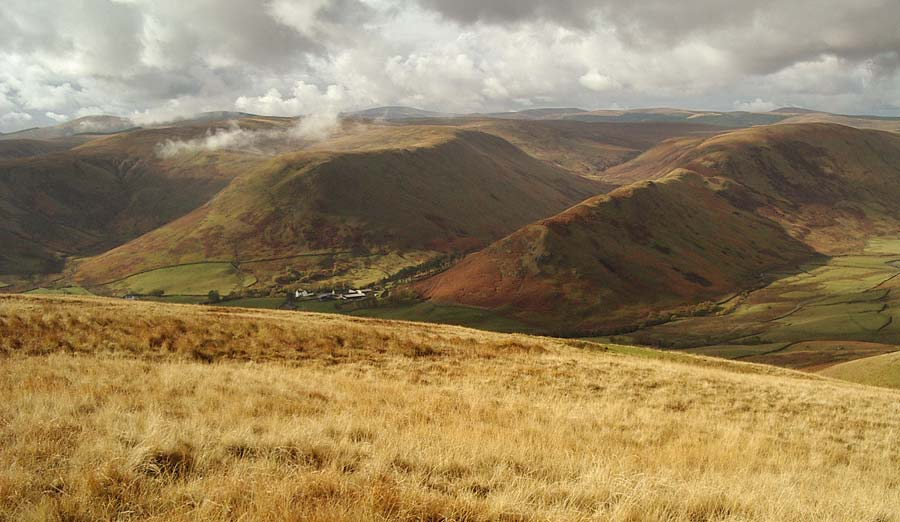
Scaur hills near Glenmanna and Glenwhargen from Woodend Hill.

In the south/south east, the valleys of Water of Ken, Dalwhat, Shinnel and Scaur Waters have roads running deep into the central hill area with active farming communities eating well into the hill area up these glens. Between the glens there are a series of ridges which gently increase in height towards the central area of the hills around Blacklorg and Polskeoch. These ridges make for easy, pleasant, but unspectacular walking except for the area near the head of Scaur Water where there is considerable visual interest among the cluster of low but shapely hills around Glenmanna, Glenwhargen Craig and Cairnkinna Hill, the highest hill in the eastern half of these hills, at 552 metres.

Just over one kilometre east of the village of Tynron is Tynron Doon (289 metres), the site of an Iron Age fort occupied from pre-Christian times till the 16th century (OS Ref. NX819939).

== Access to Carsphairn Hills ==
At the western end of these hills, near Dalmellington, there is an extensive area of forest called Carsphairn Forest which does not make for the most interesting walking territory. For the outdoor enthusiast there is however, a 23-kilometre cycle route through this forest (with some 250 metres of climbing). For the alternative live music enthusiast there are "Twin Music Festivals" held bi-annually at Knockengorroch (OS Ref NX555972) a "World Ceilidh" and a "Doonhame Hairth". Buses are run directly to the festivals from Glasgow and Edinburgh and the festivals take place 4 miles (6 km) into the hills off the already remote A713. To the east of Carsphairn Forest is where the highest hills in this whole hill area lie.

=== Cairnsmore of Carsphairn ===
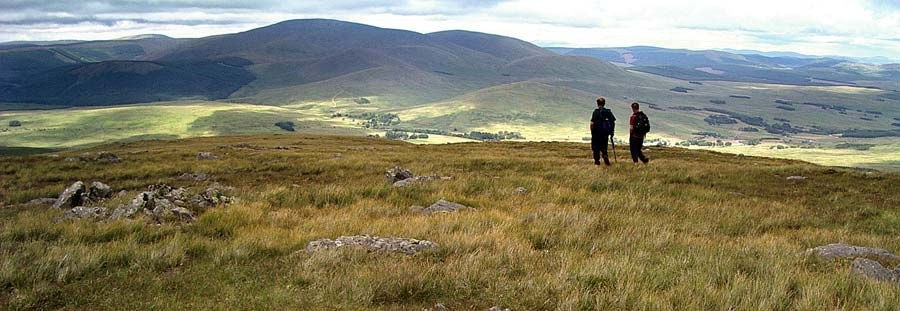
Looking east across the Glenkens to the group of hills around Cairnsmore of Carsphairn - from Cairnsgarroch in the Rhinns of Kells"

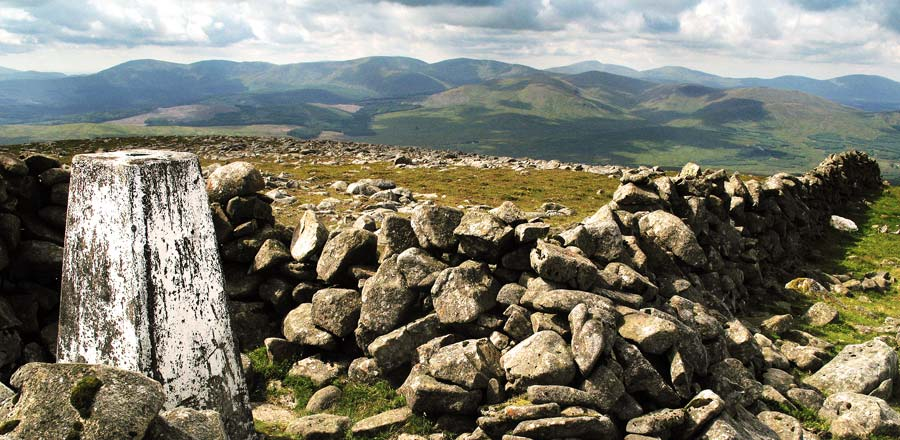
Looking west across the Glenkens to the Rhinns of Kells and the Awful Hand in the Galloway Hills from Cairnsmore of Carsphairn."

At 797 metres Cairnsmore of Carsphairn is the highest of these Carsphairn hills. The most commonly used route onto this hill is to park in the lay-by across the road from Green Well of Scotland where the Water of Deuch runs under the A713 (OS Ref NX557944), and from there follow the twisting undulating ridge over Willieana (over 420 metres) Dunool (541 metres) and Black Shoulder (688 metres). This leads to the col between Cairnsmore to the north west and Beninner (710 metres) to the south east along the summit ridge. Both tops are worth visiting for the views they offer. In general walkers tend to go back the way they came but it is possible to return by the Benlock Burn.

=== Water of Ken routes ===
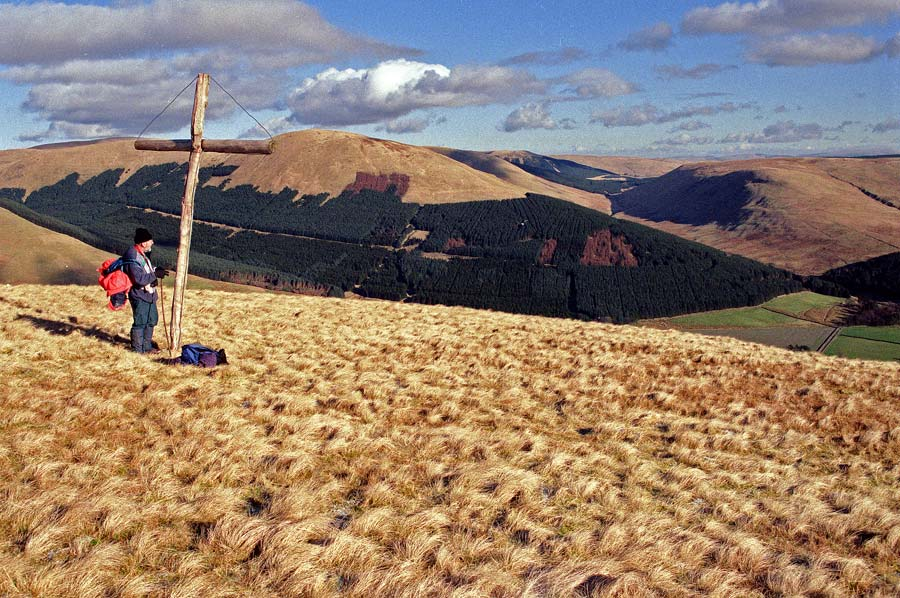
From the final station of the cross on top of Dodd Hill looking north east over the Holm Burn to Mid Rig with Ewe Hill on the right of the picture."

Just where the B729 road crosses the Water of Ken (OS Ref NX633918) a minor road heads north up the valley of the Water of Ken. There are three useful places to park along this road to go into the Carsphairn hills - Moorbrock house, Nether Holm of Dalquhairn and Lorg.

- To get to Moorbrock house head north for some 2 kilometres off the Water of Ken minor road from Craigengillan. Park just south of Moorbrock house (OS Ref NX629965). From here it is possible to go over Moorbrock Hill (650 metres) and then south west to Cairnsmore of Carsphairn and Beninner in an interesting day's walk, passing a memorial to the crew of a crashed Spitfire (23 May 1942) in the hollow before climbing Cairnsmore (OS Ref NX603993). Head east from Beninner back to Moorbrock house.
- From Moorbrock house it is also possible to go over Moorbrock Hill and head north eastward to Windy Standard (698 metres) with its profusion of 36 windmills dating from 1996. From there return by Mid Hill of Glenhead (531 metres) and Dodd Hill (496 metres).
- Parking on the Water of Ken minor road near Nether Holm of Dalquhairn (OS Ref NX663994) climb Dodd Hill following the 14 Stations of the Cross which run up Dodd Hill in the form of crosses - from beside the house at Nether Holm of Dalquhairn. Make for Windy Standard and come back by Alhang (642 metres) and Mid Rig. In the col between Alhang and Alwhat (628 metres) is the source of Afton Water and from Alwhat there are views down over Afton reservoir to the north with Cannock Hill (594 metres) Craigbraneoch Rig and Blackcraig Hill (700 metres) to the east of it.
- Parking just south of Lorg (OS Ref NS667008) head over Lorg Hill, Meikledodd Hill to Blacklorg Hill and Blackcraig Hill, descend over Craigbraneoch Rig (576 metres) to the north end of Afton Reservoir and return by the west shore of the reservoir, Alwhat and the Lorg Burn.

=== From Afton Water ===
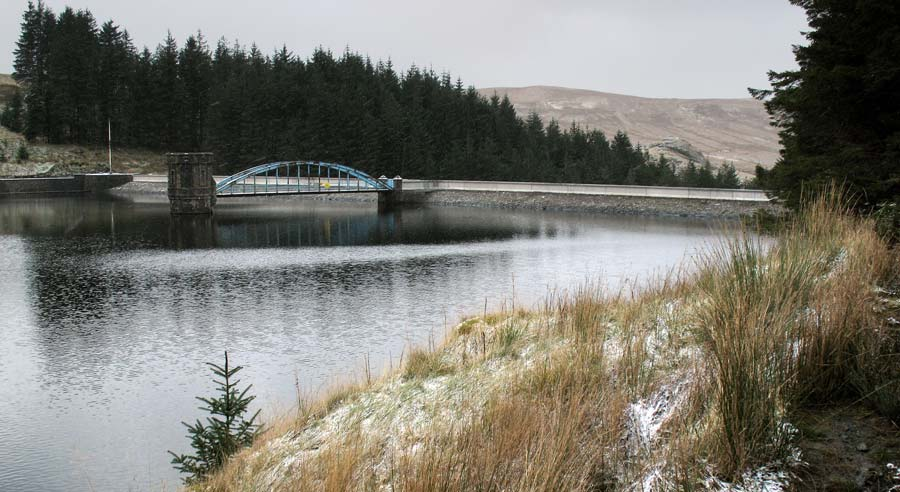
The dam of Afton reservoir.

- New Cumnock sits right at the foot of the lower slopes of Hare Hill which lies to the south east of it. So it is possible to set off directly from the town into the hills. Hare Hill has a wind farm on top of it which became operational in the year 2000 .
- It is also possible to head south west from town up Connelburn Rig, and Benty Cowan Hill (447 metres) to Enoch Hill (569 metres) where the source of the River Nith is to be found - on its south west shoulder.
- To get into the heart of the hills more quickly you can drive south up Glen Afton to the parking place just north of the reservoir. A good circular route from here is to head north west onto Blackcraig Hill then follow the undulating ridge southward over Blacklorg Hill (681 metres), and Meikledodd Hill, then south west for Alwhat and Alhang. The River Afton can then be followed down to the reservoir, or, Windy Standard can be visited - though this involves some 150 metres descent followed by a steep 200 metres climb to Windy Standard. Returning north east from Windy Standard over Wedder Hill (597 metres) gives good views over the reservoir to Craigbraneoch Rig and Blackcraig Hill beyond it. The surface of Afton Reservoir sits at around the 400 metre mark.

=== From Kirkconnel and Sanquhar ===
Mining communities in general have a strongly egalitarian sense of communal social identity and an equally strong loyalty to their local environment. This is well illustrated by the fact that in 2010 Sanquhar celebrates the centenary of its riding of the marches, which takes place over a 10-day period in August. The Euchan Water, the Kello Water and the Crawick all run into the River Nith in the immediate area around Sanquhar and Kirkconnel and these waters are much used by the local community for walking and for swimming in during the summer.

== Surrounding Communities ==
There are three quite distinctive types of community surrounding this hill area, taking these in clockwise order we have; the essentially pastoral communities from Carron Bridge through Thornhill and Penpont to Moniaive, the isolated moorland community around Carsphairn and the coal mining towns from Dalmellington through New Cumnock, Kirkconnel and Kelloholm to Sanquhar.

=== Carronbridge to Moniaive ===
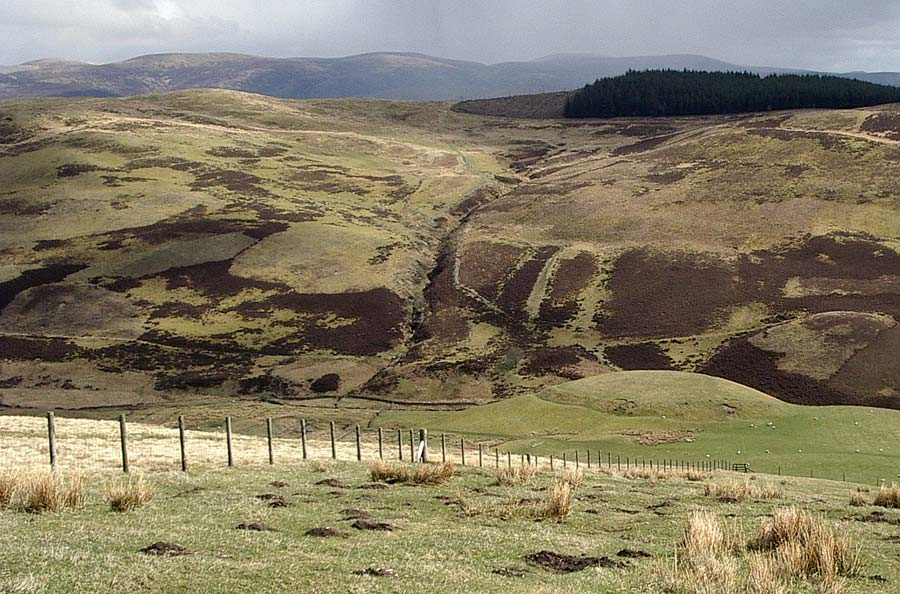
Earthwork (near bottom of the picture on the right) by Druidhill Burn near Penpont with the Lowther hills in the distance from the east shoulder of Cairnkinna.

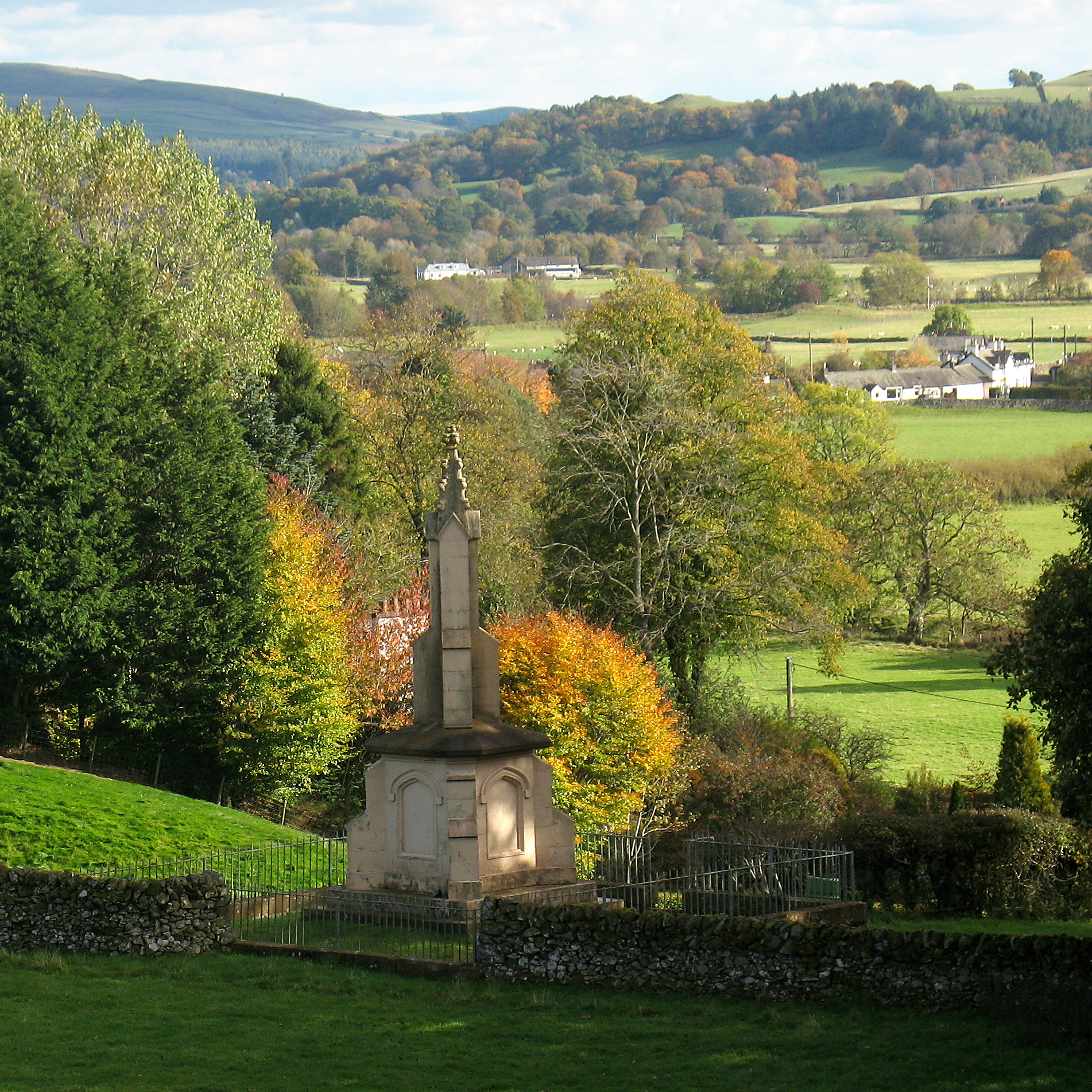
View of the Renwick Monument Moniaive with the Cairn Valley beyond

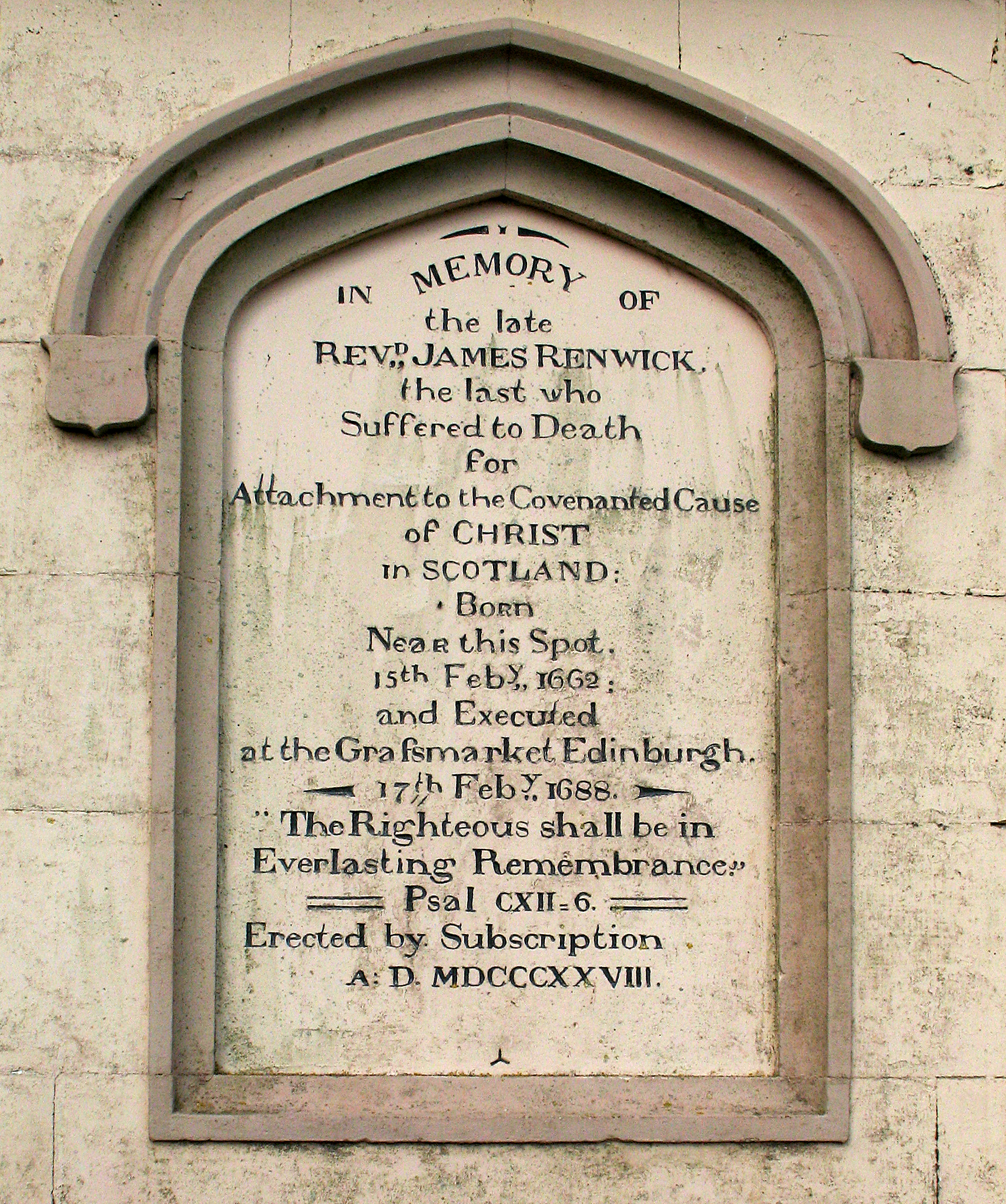
Inscription on the Renwick Monument

The economy of this area is very much dominated by the presence of the Duke of Buccleuch's Drumlanrig Estate which controls much of the area and is a major employer within the community. One of the great highways of medieval times was the pilgrimage route from Edinburgh to Whithorn in Galloway, much of which is preserved to-day as a hard-beaten track alongside or parallel to the present road. This route came by Durisdeer to Penpont, Tynron, Moniaive, and on to St John's Town of Dalry)

- Carronbridge is a small hamlet at the junction of the A76 and the A702 where the estate built its sawmill in 1850s.
- Thornhill (population roughly 2600) was created a burgh of barony in 1664 (though its existence pre-dates that considerably) and in the 18th century it was developed as an estate village for Drumlanrig Castle.The town was planned with a basic rectilinear design allowing wide tree-lined streets.
- Penpont is a small rural village with a population of roughly 400 people. It was the birthplace of Joseph Thomson, the geologist and explorer after whom Thomson's Gazelle is named. The sculptor Andy Goldsworthy has lived in the village for many years and retains a workshop there. Many of his works can be found in the surrounding countryside. The birthplace of Kirkpatrick Macmillan, the inventor of the bicycle is just over a kilometre south of Penpont and between Penpont and Moniaive at Maxwelton House was the birthplace of Annie Laurie made famous in the song of that name and the subject of the 1927 movie also of that name.
- Moniaive is the last community on the A702 before a 12 miles (19 km) drive over moorland to St John's Town Dalry in the Glenkens or a 15 miles (24 km) one over mostly single track road to Carsphairn on the B729. So in many ways it feels like the terminus of the lively Nithsdale communities. Yet it is far from being an end of the road village. Because it is in itself picturesque and in a picturesque setting it has of recent years become something of a Mecca for people who want to get away from city life. This could be said for most of this part of Nithsdale but Moniaive has to be the epicentre for the community of artists, crafts people and musicians (some of international standing) to be found in the area carrying on a tradition which goes back to James Paterson the landscape artist and one of the Glasgow Boys who was likewise drawn here in 1884.

In the 17th century Moniaive became the refuge for the Covenanters, a group of Presbyterian nonconformists who rebelled at having the Episcopalian form of religion forced on them by the last three Stuart kings, Charles I, Charles II and James II of England (James VII of Scotland). There is a monument off the Ayr Road to James Renwick, a Covenanter leader born here who was executed in Edinburgh.

=== Carsphairn ===
Carsphairn is the only village between Moniaive and Dalmellington - 15 miles (24 km) from the former and 10 miles (16 km) from the latter (over high moorland lightly populated road). It is a parish of 80 square miles (210 km^{2}) with a population of less than 200 set in a bowl between the Rhinns of Kells and the imposing mass of Cairnsmore of Carsphairn. Farming was the main use of land here but now a greater part is afforested with only a few farms left. There are 38 houses, a school, a church, a pub, a shop and post office in Carsphairn village. The village also has its own Heritage Centre, although opening hours are seasonal. Even though it sits on the A713 it is a remote, isolated and largely scattered community quite different in character from the small but active towns and villages along the River Nith or the Moniaive, Penpont area.

=== Dalmellington to Sanquhar ===
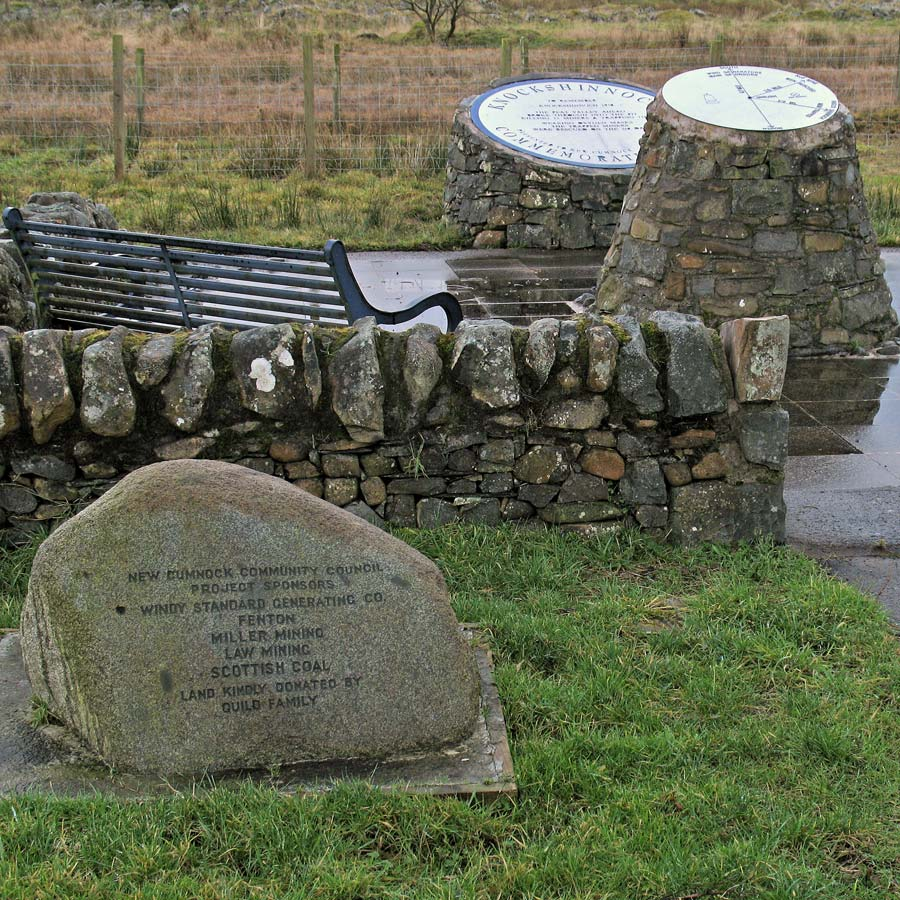
Memorials to the miners who died in the Knockshinnoch mining disaster in 1950. The stone in the foreground tells of the sponsors of the memorials. The nearer conical memorial indicates where the events took place. The text on the third memorial says "To remember Knockshinnoch 1950. The peat valley ahead broke through into the pit killing 13 miners & trapping 116. Wearing oxygen masks the trapped miners were rescued on the 3rd day."

- Dalmellington is the last outpost Ayrshire town before the A713 road climbs towards the Glenkens and ultimately Castle Douglas. In the 2001 census it had a population of 1407. River Doon issues from the northern end of Loch Doon and passes close to the town, while the Loch Doon itself receives waters from Loch Enoch via Eglin Lane. River Doon flows through Alloway where the Robert Burns cottage is and the river features strongly in his songs and poetry.

At one time the mills of Dalmellington produced yarn for the carpet making industry in Kilmarnock and there were also about 40 weavers working from home there. By the 20th century mining was the dominant industry, though workers had to travel to outlying areas. Eight pits producing around 124,000 tons a year were operating in the 1940s. With the decline of the labour-intensive deep mining, the area is now dependent on its replacement, opencast mining.

- New Cumnock is mentioned in the Ragman Roll of 1296 and Cumnock Castle comes into the story of the First War of Scottish Independence in the time of William Wallace and Robert the Bruce both of whom were active in the area. Wallace may even have been born close by. In 1509 it was made a burgh of barony and in more recent times coal mining dominated the economy. In 1950 13 miners lost their lives here in the Knockshinnoch Disaster though 116 men were rescued.
- Kirkconnel had been primarily a farming community until the 1890s when a coal pit was opened at Fauldhead. Coal had always been mined in the district before that, but never in large quantities. From then on coal dominated the life of the little town. The coal industry moved away in recent decades, and with it much of the population.
- Kelloholm was created in 1921 as a model village to house miners and expanded after the Second World War. Its main industry since the collapse of deep mining is now meat-processing.
- Sanquhar's economy had been connected with the wool trade and the production of carpets before the coal mining industry came to dominate it. A distinctive two-coloured pattern of knitting is still widely known as 'Sanquhar knitting'. It was also the place where the Covenanters signed the Sanquhar Declaration renouncing their allegiance to the King, an event commemorated by a monument in the main street. The church of St. Brides contains a memorial to James Crichton, 'The Admirable Crichton', a sixteenth-century polymath. Sanquhar is notable also for its tiny post office (established in 1712), claimed to be the oldest working post office in the world.

== Cormilligan ==
How much obscure corners in these hills can mean to people who have what seems like the most distant of connections with them was well illustrated during Scotland's Year of Homecoming in 2009 when 38 descendants of the McCaw family marked the Homecoming Year by gathering together from New Zealand, the US, Mexico, Greece and England at the remote deserted cottage of Cormilligan near Tynron. They joined local people in celebrating the lives of their ancestors William and Isabella McCaw who emigrated to Otago in New Zealand with nine of their 10 surviving children in 1880.

== Deil's Dyke ==
There are several Devil's Dykes in England and on the continent of Europe. The Devil has various familiar names in Scots such as "the deil", "auld nick" and "auld horny", and so in Scots "Devil's Dyke" becomes "The Deil's Dyke". This name was given to a series of earthworks that were thought to mark a frontier perhaps between Strathclyde Britons and the Angles in Galloway and running from Loch Ryan to near Annan on the Solway and perhaps even from coast to coast in association with the Catrail in Roxburghshire. This notion was put forward by the antiquarian Joseph Train who had picked up on folk belief concerning a Deil's Dyke. Eventually this concept of a single Deil's Dyke was discounted by antiquarian scholars in favour of separate unrelated earthworks which had been strung together in Train's imagination. However a section of the dyke running from New Cumnock to Burnmouth in the Parish of Durisdeer has continued to interest them.
