= Kearse =

Kearse is a surname, and may refer to:

- Amalya Lyle Kearse (born 1937), American judge
- Eddie Kearse (1916–1968), American baseball player
- Frank Kearse (born 1988), American football player
- Jayron Kearse (born 1994), American football player
- Jermaine Kearse (born 1990), American football player
- Jevon Kearse (born 1976), American football player
- Leo Kearse (born 1976); British comedian
- NaShawn Kearse (born 1972), American television and film actor
