= Susan Hunter Stirling =

Scottish novelist (1799–1877)

- Born: October 3, 1799; St Andrews
- Died: October 22, 1877
- Occupation: Novelist
- Spouse: James Stirling
- Parents: James Hunter (father); Jane Wilson (mother)

Susan Hunter Stirling (October 3, 1799 – October 22, 1877) was a Scottish novelist.

She was born Susan Hunter in 1799 in St. Andrews, Scotland, the daughter of Rev. James Hunter, professor at the University of St Andrews and son of Professor John Hunter, and Jane Wilson Hunter, daughter of Rev. Charles Wilson, professor of Hebrew at St. Andrews. She was friends and correspondents with Thomas Carlyle, Jane Carlyle, and Leigh Hunt and once briefly drew the ire of Jane Carlyle when she was the subject of Hunt's over-attention at a social gathering.

In 1837, she married James Stirling, a railway and dock gate engineer. They permanently settled in Edinburgh in 1846. Susan Hunter Stirling published two novels anonymously: Fanny Hervey: or, The Mother's Choice (1849) and Sedgely Court (1865). She died in 1877.

== Bibliography ==
- Fanny Hervey: or, The Mother's Choice. A Story. 2 vol. London: Chapman and Hall, 1849.
- Sedgely Court: A Tale. 3 vol. Edinburgh: Blackwood, 1865.
