= List of listed buildings in Tynron, Dumfries and Galloway =

This is a list of listed buildings in the civil parish of Tynron in Dumfries and Galloway, Scotland.

== List ==
| Name | Location | Date Listed | Grid Ref. (Note: Sometimes known as OSGB36, the grid reference (where provided) is based on the British national grid reference system used by the Ordnance Survey. • "Guide to National Grid". Ordnance Survey. • "Get-a-map". Ordnance Survey.) | Geo-coordinates | Notes | LB Number (Note: Historic Environment Scotland assign a unique alphanumeric identifier to each designated site in Scotland, for listed buildings this always begins with "LB", for example "LB12345".) | Image |
|---|---|---|---|---|---|---|---|
| Lairds Bridge Over Kirkconnell Burn | | | | 55°13′41″N 3°55′02″W | Category C(S) | 17182 | Upload another image See more images |
| Tynron Village Rose Cottage, The Old Post Office, Un-Named Cottage & H Black | | | | 55°13′01″N 3°52′40″W | Category B | 17224 | Upload Photo |
| Dalmakerran With Stable Range, Cottage, Gatepiers, Balustrade And Steps | | | | 55°12′47″N 3°53′09″W | Category B | 49982 | Upload Photo |
| Scaur Bridge A702 Over Scaur Water | | | | 55°13′47″N 3°49′31″W | Category C(S) | 17217 | Upload Photo |
| Shinnelwood House | | | | 55°13′13″N 3°50′30″W | Category C(S) | 17218 | Upload Photo |
| Tynron Village Cottages Property Of Mr Scott, Stenhouse | | | | 55°13′00″N 3°52′41″W | Category B | 17223 | Upload Photo |
| Auchenhessnane Farmhouse And East Steading Wing | | | | 55°15′02″N 3°53′01″W | Category B | 17175 | Upload Photo |
| Killiewarren Farmhouse And Adjoining Steading Range | | | | 55°13′17″N 3°53′39″W | Category B | 17178 | Upload Photo |
| Kirkland House West Gatepiers And Railings | | | | 55°13′02″N 3°52′35″W | Category B | 17181 | Upload Photo |
| Stenhouse House And Conservatory | | | | 55°13′03″N 3°53′17″W | Category C(S) | 17219 | Upload Photo |
| Stenhouse Lodge | | | | 55°12′59″N 3°53′17″W | Category C(S) | 17220 | Upload Photo |
| Capenoch Lodge, Quadrant Walls And Gatepiers | | | | 55°13′46″N 3°49′30″W | Category B | 17177 | Upload Photo |
| Lann Hall Gatepiers At West Gate | | | | 55°12′42″N 3°52′19″W | Category C(S) | 17215 | Upload Photo |
| Tynron Village Tynron Parish Church | | | | 55°13′01″N 3°52′42″W | Category A | 17222 | Upload another image See more images |
| Kirkland House | | | | 55°13′03″N 3°52′28″W | Category C(S) | 17179 | Upload Photo |
| Mounthoolie Bridge Over Shinnel Water | | | | 55°13′48″N 3°55′03″W | Category C(S) | 17216 | Upload another image |
| Tynron Village Tynron Bridge (Over Shinnel Water) | | | | 55°12′58″N 3°52′43″W | Category B | 17221 | Upload Photo |
| Kirkland House North Gatepiers And Railings | | | | 55°13′04″N 3°52′25″W | Category B | 17180 | Upload Photo |
| Lann Hall House And Walled Garden | | | | 55°12′44″N 3°52′26″W | Category B | 17183 | Upload Photo |
| Lann Hall North Lodge And Gatepiers | | | | 55°12′53″N 3°52′34″W | Category B | 17184 | Upload Photo |

== Key ==
The scheme for classifying buildings in Scotland is:

- Category A: "buildings of national or international importance, either architectural or historic; or fine, little-altered examples of some particular period, style or building type."
- Category B: "buildings of regional or more than local importance; or major examples of some particular period, style or building type, which may have been altered."
- Category C: "buildings of local importance; lesser examples of any period, style, or building type, as originally constructed or moderately altered; and simple traditional buildings which group well with other listed buildings."

In March 2016 there were 47,288 listed buildings in Scotland. Of these, 8% were Category A, and 50% were Category B, with the remaining 42% being Category C.
