= Shinnel Water =

River in Dumfries and Galloway, Scotland

Coordinates: 55°13′N 3°50′W

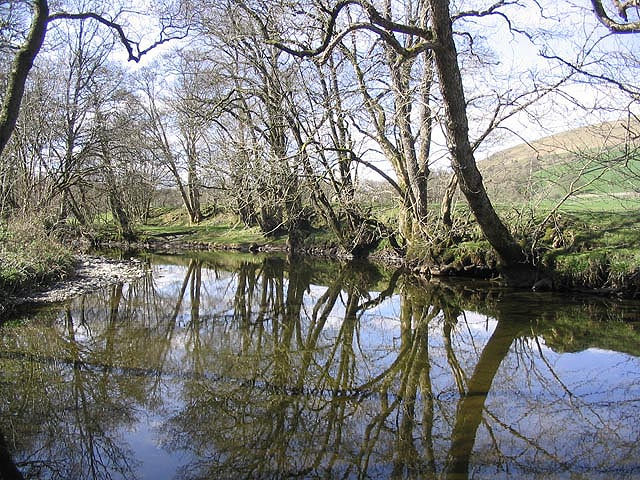
Shinnel Water

Shinnel Water, also spelt Shinnell, is a river in the region of Dumfries and Galloway, Scotland.

It rises in the Scaur hills of Tynron Parish in the Southern Uplands at an altitude of 460m, and flows 13 miles to join Scaur Water near Penpont, at an altitude of 70m. There are two notable features of the Shinnel: at the confluence of the two rivers, it flows over a ridge of rocks with some force; and three miles upstream, the river forms a picturesque waterfall at Aird Linn.

Like Scaur Water, the Shinnel is renowned for trout fishing and flows through birch and oak forest.
