= List of listed buildings in Penpont, Dumfries and Galloway =

This is a list of listed buildings in the civil parish of Penpont in Dumfries and Galloway, Scotland.

== List ==
Name	Location	Date Listed	Grid Ref. (Note: Sometimes known as OSGB36, the grid reference (where provided) is based on the British national grid reference system used by the Ordnance Survey. • "Guide to National Grid". Ordnance Survey. • "Get-a-map". Ordnance Survey.)	Geo-coordinates	Notes	LB Number (Note: Historic Environment Scotland assign a unique alphanumeric identifier to each designated site in Scotland, for listed buildings this always begins with "LB", for example "LB12345".)	Image
Arkland Farmhouse And Steading				55°15′39″N 3°53′04″W	Category B	17278	Upload Photo
Grovehill Lodge				55°14′24″N 3°47′31″W	Category B	17284	Upload Photo
Penpont Village House At East Corner Main Street/Princes Street				55°13′57″N 3°48′53″W	Category B	17289	Upload Photo
Penpont Village 4 & 5 Marrburn Road Drummore And Glenview				55°14′00″N 3°48′50″W	Category C(S)	17291	Upload Photo
Drumlanrig Walled Garden And Gateways, Outbuildings And Cottages				55°15′58″N 3°47′48″W	Category B	17296	Upload Photo
Penpont Village Penpont Church And Churchyard				55°13′52″N 3°48′42″W	Category B	17267	Upload Photo
Penpont Village School And Schoolhouse				55°13′56″N 3°48′39″W	Category C(S)	17268	Upload Photo
Auchenknight Farmhouse				55°15′39″N 3°49′09″W	Category B	17279	Upload Photo
Eccles Lodge				55°14′35″N 3°48′36″W	Category C(S)	17282	Upload Photo
Merkland Farmhouse And Steading				55°16′40″N 3°52′07″W	Category B	17285	Upload Photo
Nith Bridge (A702 Over River Nith)				55°14′26″N 3°46′39″W	Category A	17286	Upload Photo
Chanlockfoot Bridge (Over Scaur Water)				55°16′47″N 3°54′20″W	Category C(S)	17292	Upload Photo
Drumlanrig Summerhouse South West Of St Geoffrey's Bridge				55°16′09″N 3°49′18″W	Category B	17300	Upload Photo
Penpont Village Main Street Carlingwark Fingland And Morrison				55°13′58″N 3°48′48″W	Category C(S)	17226	Upload Photo
Marrburn Road (Joseph Thomson Cottage), Penpont Village And Ancillary Buildings				55°13′59″N 3°48′50″W	Category B	17265	Upload Photo
Scaur Bridge (A702 Over Scaur Water)				55°13′47″N 3°49′31″W	Category C(S)	17270	Upload Photo
Virginhall Former Free Church				55°14′25″N 3°47′15″W	Category C(S)	17273	Upload Photo
Grovehill House				55°14′22″N 3°47′27″W	Category B	17283	Upload Photo
Old Auchenbainzie Farmhouse (Auldtoon)				55°15′26″N 3°50′43″W	Category B	17287	Upload Photo
Chanlockfoot Farmhouse And Steading				55°16′48″N 3°54′16″W	Category B	17293	Upload Photo
Eccles House				55°14′44″N 3°48′49″W	Category B	17301	Upload Photo
Penpont Village Corse Road Burnbrae House				55°13′59″N 3°48′56″W	Category B	17263	Upload Photo
Penpont Village Marrburn Road Empty Cottages, Formerly Wallace And Vernon (Property Buccleuch Estates)				55°13′59″N 3°48′49″W	Category C(S)	17266	Upload Photo
Clonhie Farmhouse And Steading				55°14′49″N 3°49′37″W	Category B	17294	Upload Photo
Drumlanrig Heather House (Summerhouse North Of Low Gardens House)				55°16′04″N 3°48′07″W	Category B	17298	Upload Photo
Scaur Bridge (Penpont-Keirmill Road Over Scaur Water)				55°13′47″N 3°48′40″W	Category B	17271	Upload Photo
Arkland Bridge At Foggiehall (Over Druidhill Burn)				55°15′47″N 3°52′56″W	Category B	17275	Upload Photo
Eccles Walled Garden				55°14′36″N 3°48′42″W	Category C(S)	17281	Upload Photo
Penpont Village 1 Marrburn Road Albury				55°13′59″N 3°48′49″W	Category C(S)	17290	Upload Photo
Penpont Village Main Street/Keir Road The Toll House Thomas Brash (House And Shop/Post Office)				55°13′56″N 3°48′50″W	Category C(S)	17228	Upload Photo
Penpont Village Main Street 1 The Cross And Adjoining Archway				55°13′57″N 3°48′49″W	Category C(S)	17264	Upload Photo
Arkland Bridge (Over Scaur Water)				55°15′47″N 3°52′56″W	Category B	17276	Upload Photo
Penpont Village Main Street Marr House Including Shop (Former Post Office)				55°13′56″N 3°48′50″W	Category B	17288	Upload Photo
Drumlanrig Low Gardens House (Gardeners House)				55°15′53″N 3°47′57″W	Category A	17297	Upload Photo
Penpont Village Main Street 2 The Cross				55°13′57″N 3°48′49″W	Category C(S)	17225	Upload Photo
Penpont Village Warehouse (Former Granary)				55°13′59″N 3°48′53″W	Category B	17269	Upload Photo
Arkland Cottage				55°15′44″N 3°52′53″W	Category B	17277	Upload Photo
Cairnmill House				55°13′40″N 3°49′11″W	Category C(S)	17280	Upload Photo
Parkhouse Bridge (Over Marr Burn)				55°16′17″N 3°50′05″W	Category C(S)	17262	Upload Photo
Scaurbridge House				55°13′49″N 3°49′28″W	Category B	17272	Upload Photo
Drumlanrig Chimney At Newhouse Plantation				55°15′52″N 3°48′15″W	Category B	17295	Upload Photo
Penpont Village Main Street/Marrburn Road S. Cook (House And Shop)				55°13′57″N 3°48′51″W	Category B	17227	Upload Photo

== Key ==
The scheme for classifying buildings in Scotland is:

- Category A: "buildings of national or international importance, either architectural or historic; or fine, little-altered examples of some particular period, style or building type."
- Category B: "buildings of regional or more than local importance; or major examples of some particular period, style or building type, which may have been altered."
- Category C: "buildings of local importance; lesser examples of any period, style, or building type, as originally constructed or moderately altered; and simple traditional buildings which group well with other listed buildings."

In March 2016 there were 47,288 listed buildings in Scotland. Of these, 8% were Category A, and 50% were Category B, with the remaining 42% being Category C.
