= River Afton =

River in Ayrshire, Scotland

Coordinates: 55.39788°N 4.18185°W

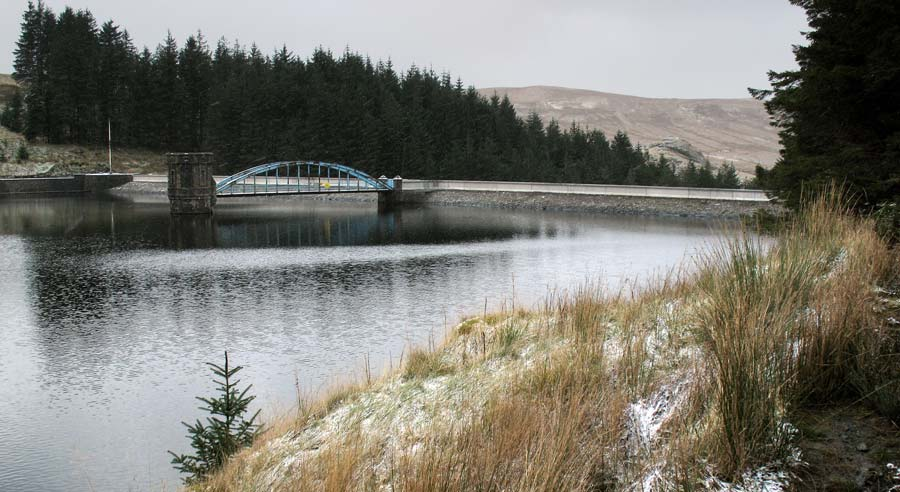
The dam of Afton reservoir.

The River Afton (or Afton Water) is a small river in Ayrshire, Scotland, which flows north from Alwhat Hill in the Carsphairn and Scaur Hills, through Afton Reservoir and then for eight miles down Glen Afton before joining the River Nith at New Cumnock.

New Cumnock in the Afton area was the scene of the Knockshinnoch disaster in 1950.

The river is celebrated in Robert Burns's poem Sweet Afton and this led to a number of townships in the United States being called Afton.

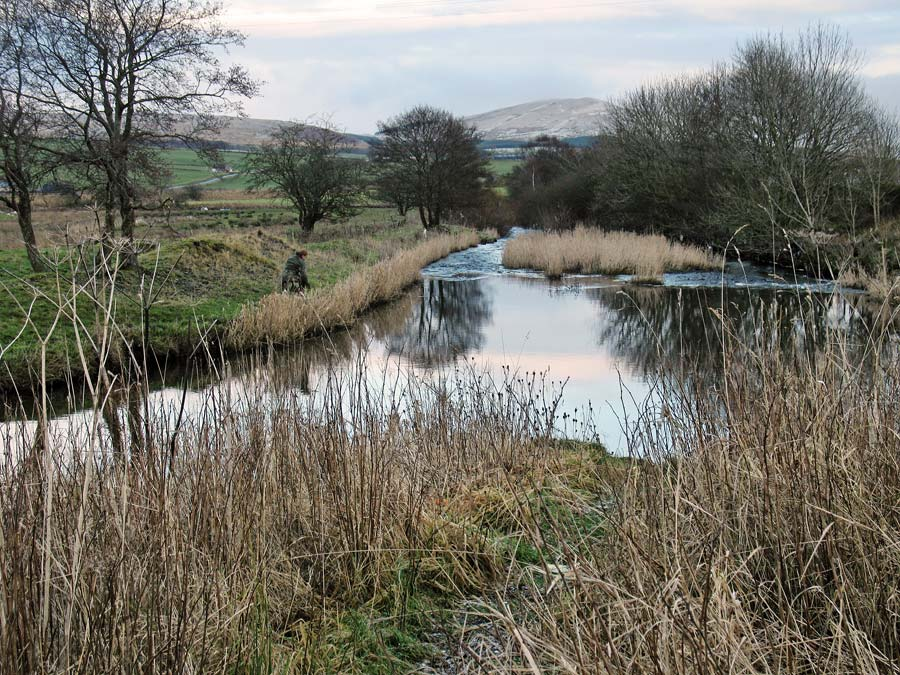
Looking south towards the River Nith at the point where it is joined by Afton Water just north of New Cumnock. The water entering from the bottom left of the picture is the River Nith and the water entering from the right is Afton Water. The hill in the background is Corsencon Hill (475 metres). Cumnock Castle stood on this site in the Middle Ages.

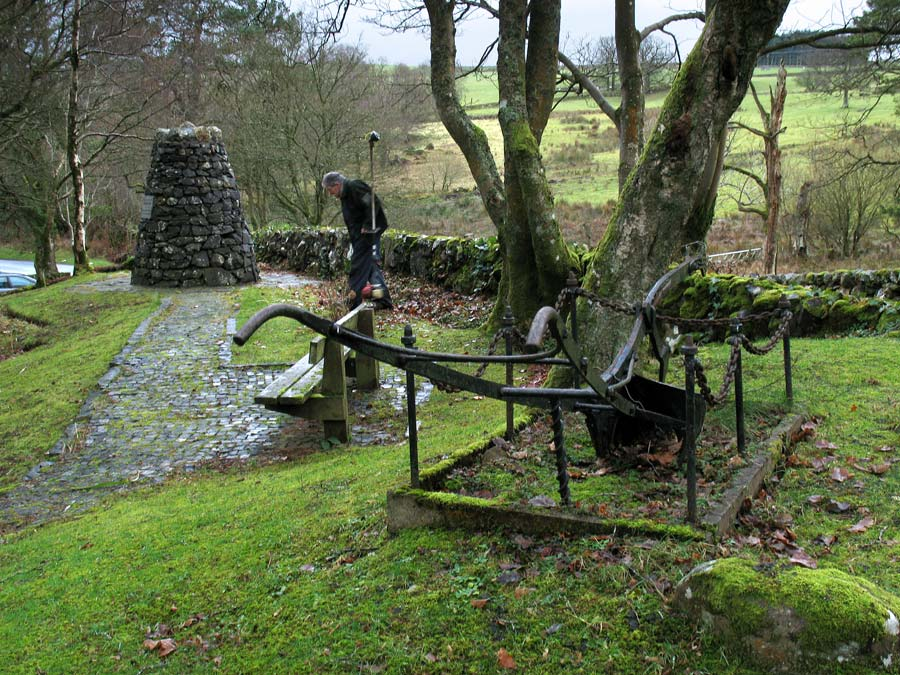
The Burns Cairn in Glen Afton. The inscription on the cairn says "Flow Gently Sweet Afton. Robert Burns 1759 - 1796. Erected by New Cumnock Burns Club (500) to mark its golden jubilee 1973."
