= James Stirling (engineer, born 1799) =

Scottish engineer

James Stirling (1800–1876)
- Born: 20 July 1800; Methven
- Died: 10 January 1876 (aged 75); Edinburgh
- Engineering career
- Discipline: Mechanical engineering

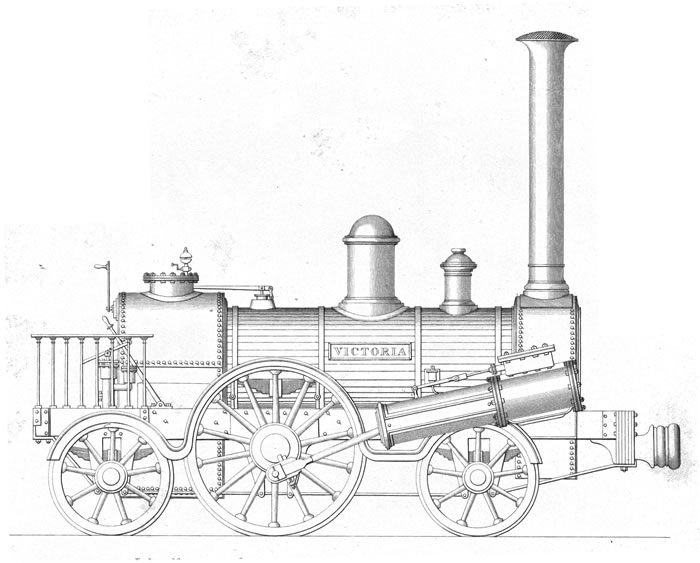
James Stirling and Co 2-2-2 locomotive Victoria for the Arbroath and Forfar Railway Gauge 1,676 mm (5 ft 6 in).

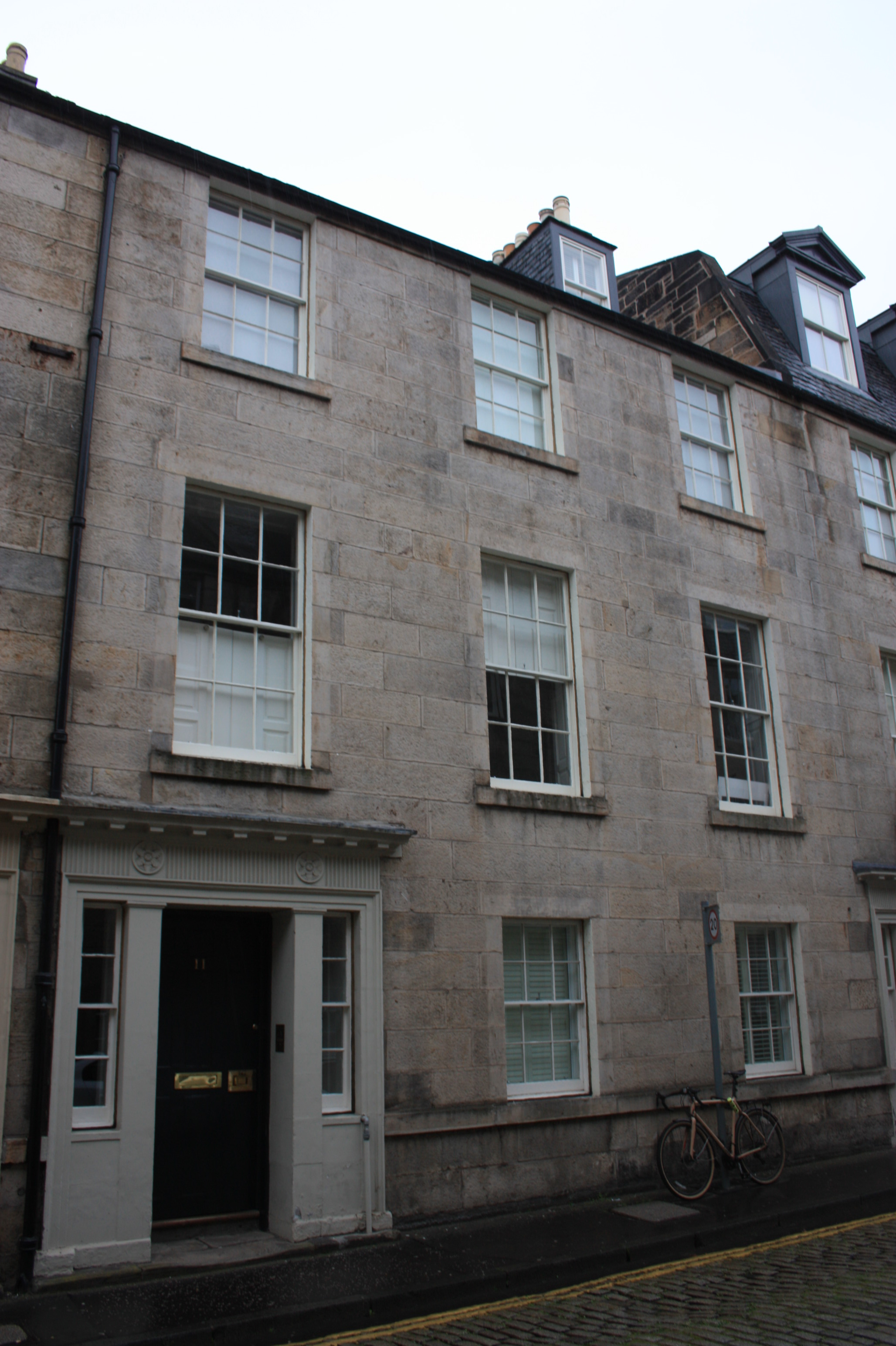
11 Hill Street, Edinburgh

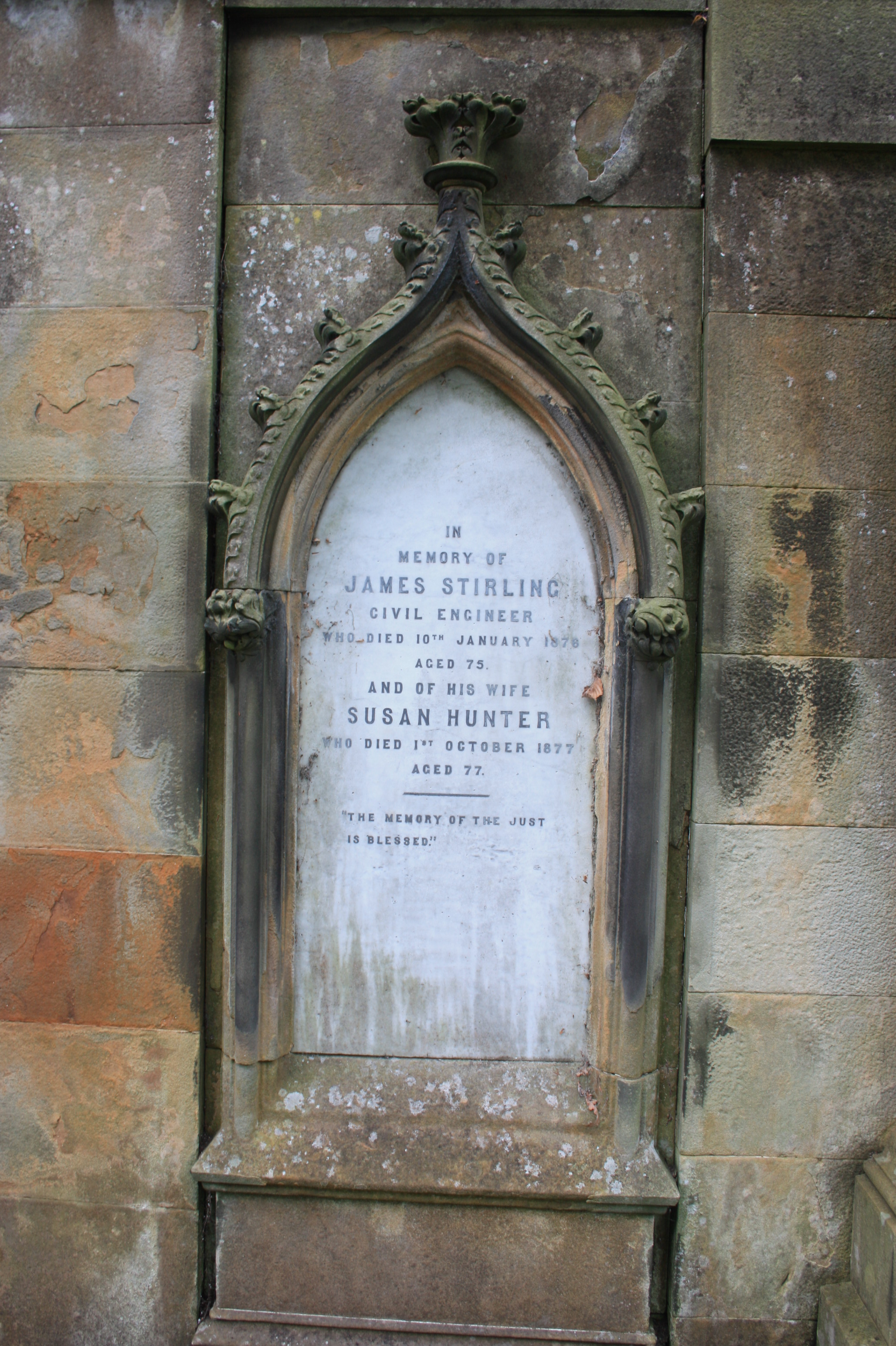
The grave of James Stirling, Dean Cemetery, Edinburgh

James Stirling (3 March 1799, Methven – 10 January 1876, Edinburgh) was a Scottish engineer, and brother of Robert Stirling. He originally specialised railway engines and later in dock gates and weirs

== Life ==
He was born at Cloag Farm near Methven in Perthshire, the son of Patrick and Janet Stirling. He originally studied divinity, intending to be a minister in the Church of Scotland. However, inspired by his brother Robert, he instead decided to be an engineer, and was apprenticed to Claude Girdwood & Co in Glasgow as a mechanical engineer. The company specialised in making cotton gins.

He then became manager of the Dundee Foundry, which built several locomotives for the Dundee and Newtyle Railway. In 1827 he patented, together with his brother Robert Stirling an Air engine.

In 1842 he built the Dundee hot air engine. The first engine of this kind which, after various modifications, was efficiently constructed and heated, had a cylinder of 12 inches (approx. 30 cm) in diameter, with a length of stroke of 2 feet (approx. 61 cm), and made 40 strokes or revolutions in a minute (40 rpm). This engine moved all the machinery at the Dundee Foundry Company's works for eight or ten months, and was previously found capable of raising 700,000 lbs one foot in a minute (approx. 21 HP).

James Stirling and Co was located at East Foundry/Victoria Foundry, Dundee. It is unclear whether it was a separate business from the Dundee Foundry.

In 1846 James Stirling left Dundee and set up an engineering practice in Edinburgh. He lived at 11 Hill Street in Edinburgh's First New Town. He died in Edinburgh on 10 January 1876. He is buried in the south-west spur of Dean Cemetery in western Edinburgh.

== Locomotives by Stirling ==
Steam locomotives built by the Dundee Foundry/James Stirling & Co included:

- Trotter, built 1834 for the Dundee and Newtyle Railway
- Princess, Victoria and Britannia, (all 2-2-2s) built 1838/9 for the Arbroath and Forfar Railway - 1,676 mm (5 ft 6 in)
- Two further locomotives for the Arbroath and Forfar Railway
- At least one locomotive for the Newtyle and Coupar Angus Railway

== Family ==
In 1837 he was married to Susan Hunter (1800-1877), daughter of Prof James Hunter of St Andrews University.

Susan Stirling (as she was afterwards known) was a successful author, including works such as "Fanny Hervey or the Mother's Choice" (1849).
