= Joseph Laing Waugh =

Scottish businessman and author

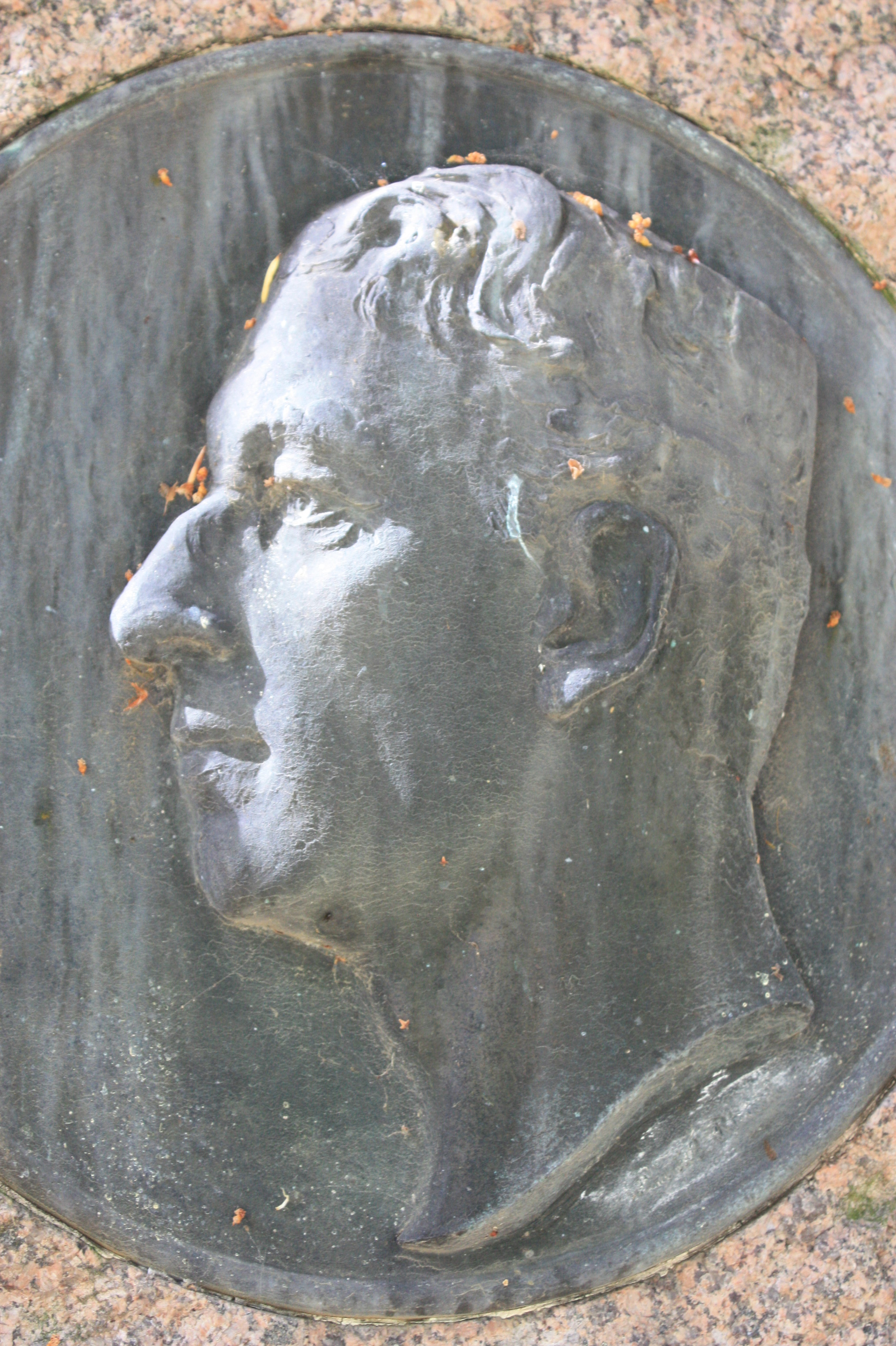
Medallion portrait of Joseph Laing Waugh by William Birnie Rhind

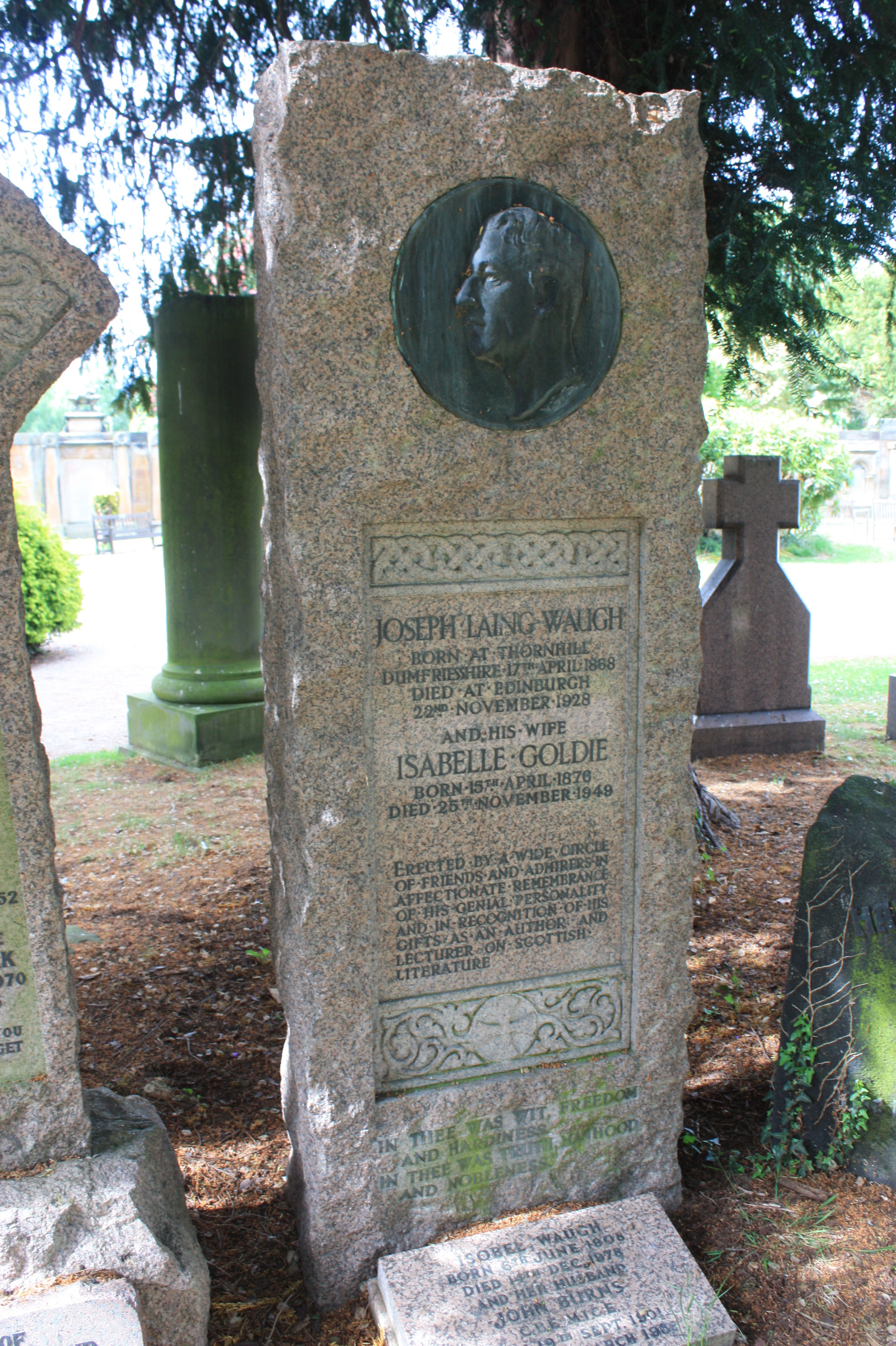
The grave of Joseph Laing Waugh, Dean Cemetery, Edinburgh

Joseph Laing Waugh (1868–1928) was a Scottish businessman and writer.

== Life ==
Waugh was born in Thornhill, Dumfries and Galloway on 17 April 1868. He moved to Edinburgh around 1890 where he ran a successful wallpaper business. He lived at 3 Comiston Drive in the south-west of the city. His great love however was writing. His work is sentimental in nature and largely consists of humorous biographies of characters from Dumfries and Galloway.

He died in Edinburgh on 22 November 1928. He is buried in Dean Cemetery in western Edinburgh. The grave lies under a tree in the south-east section behind the grave of Samuel Bough. It has a portrait medallion by the sculptor William Birnie Rhind. Waugh is also memorialised at 19 East Morton Street, Thornhill, with a bust by Henry Snell Gamley completed after Gamley’s death by Rhind.

== Publications ==
- And A Little Child Shall Lead Them (1890)
- Mumper and other stories (1892)
- Thornhill and Its Worthies (1905 plus several later editions)
- Robbie Doo (1912) (Robbie Doo was a stone-mason in Thornhill)
- Robert Burns: A Poem (1912)
- Cracks Wi' Robbie Doo (1914)
- Betty Grier (1915)
- Cute McCheyne and Other Stories (1917)
- Heroes in Homespun (1921)

== Family ==
He was married to Isabelle Goldie (1876-1949).

== Artistic recognition ==
A bust of Waugh is placed on a building in his home town of Thornhill. A portrait also exists in the Dumfries Museum.

In August 2010 a lecture on Waugh was presented to the Thornhill branch of Rotary International.
