= James Shaw of Tynron =

James Shaw was born in Barrhead on 22 April 1826. After a career as a calico printer Shaw undertook training as a schoolmaster and after a brief period of employment in Dovecothall School, in the lower part of Abbey Parish, Barrhead, he took up an appointment in Tynron Parish School, in Dumfriesshire, where he remained until his death in 1896.

Shaw's extensive writing was gathered together into a single volume, A Country Schoolmaster, by Robert Wallace, Professor of Agriculture and Rural Economy at the University of Edinburgh. In this volume Shaw's extensive thoughts on nature, science and the arts are brought together.

Shaw was a member of the Dumfriesshire and Galloway Natural History and Antiquarian Society, wrote for various newspapers including the Dumfries Herald and corresponded with some of the great thinkers of his age including Charles Darwin and George Henry Lewes.
