= Wallace Hall (Thornhill) =

- School's Coat of Arms

Location
- Station Road; Thornhill, Dumfriesshire, DG3 5DS; Scotland; 55.242°N 3.757°W

Information
- Type: Comprehensive
- Mottoes: 'Pro Libertate' (For Liberty) 'Working together to achieve more' 'Together we grow, learn and achieve'
- Established: 1723; 303 years ago
- Founder: John Wallace
- Authority: Dumfries and Galloway Council
- Head Teacher: Barry Graham
- Staff: 114 (2025-26)
- Years: Nursery - S6
- Gender: Mixed
- Age range: 2–18
- Enrollment: 762 (Combined, 2025-26)
- Language: English
- Colour
- National ranking: 91st in Scotland (Academy Only)
- Website: www.wallacehall.co.uk

Wallace Hall is a non-denominational, co-educational state comprehensive school located in Thornhill, Dumfries and Galloway, south-west Scotland. The school operates across a single modern campus and provides continuous education from early years through to secondary level (ages 2–18), encompassing a nursery (Early Learning Centre), primary school (Wallace Hall Primary School), and secondary school (Wallace Hall Academy) under unified leadership.

Wallace Hall was founded in 1723 through the bequest of the Glasgow merchant John Wallace as a free school for the parish of Closeburn. It remained at Closeburn until it merged with Morton Academy in the early 1970s, after which a new secondary campus opened in Thornhill in 1978. The present building, opened in 2010, houses the nursery, primary and secondary stages and serves Thornhill and the surrounding rural communities. In 2025–26 the school had a combined roll of 762 pupils.

== History ==
=== 18th Century ===
Wallace Hall was established in the early 18th century through the bequest of John Wallace, a native of Closeburn and a successful merchant based in Glasgow. In his will, Wallace allocated £1,400, as well as an additional £300 specifically for land and buildings, to establish a free school for the children of Closeburn parish, which at the time included the united parish of Dalgarnock. The endowment included five acres of land in Closeburn for the school site, as well as farmland whose rental income would be used to pay the schoolmaster's salary. The deed of mortification specified that the school was to provide instruction in "English, Latin, Greek, writing, and arithmetic" at no cost to parish children, under the supervision of the local Presbytery. Wallace also named trustees to oversee the school, including relatives bearing the Wallace name, the Minister of Closeburn, and the Town Clerk of Glasgow. Preference for the position of schoolmaster was to be given to any suitably qualified individual named Wallace.

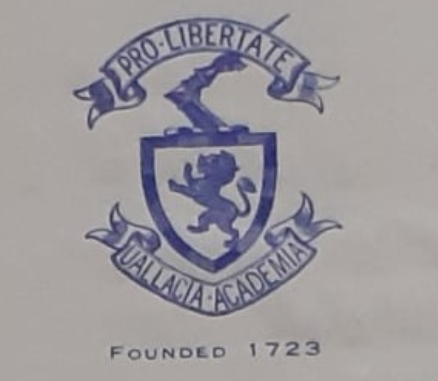
The original 1723 school crest, displaying the motto Pro Libertate

By 1724, construction of the school building had commenced on the Closeburn estate, with the cooperation of Sir Thomas Kirkpatrick. The first rector, Mr. Wauch, was appointed in 1723 and served until his death in 1744. The early school, built between 1724 and 1729 by William Luckup and John Crocket, comprised a modest stone structure along with an adjoining house for the master. The original school motto was Pro Libertate, Latin for "For Liberty", the traditional motto of Clan Wallace. A commemorative stone tablet, dated 1728, records Wallace’s gift of "1400 Pounds Ster. money… for this and another Free School within this Parish," the latter referring to a smaller school established at Gubhill under the same endowment.

Following Mr. Wauch’s tenure, the school was briefly led by two successive rectors: Patrick Wallace (1745–1748) and Archibald Wallace (1748–1749). In 1750, Alexander Mundell, a noted teacher from Edinburgh, was appointed rector. During his time at the school, Wallace Hall's reputation for academic excellence grew significantly. Mundell introduced a boarding programme that accommodated pupils from outside the local area, offering an advanced curriculum described as a “higher class” education in addition to the standard subjects.

In 1790, Dr. Robert Mundell succeeded his father Alexander as rector. In 1795, he funded the construction of a new three-storey building adjacent to the original schoolhouse. This building, which cost £1,700, served both as a residence for the rector and as additional teaching space. An inscription reading “Robertus Mundell, LL.D., Hujusce Academiae Praefectus” acknowledged Mundell’s role as headmaster. The original 1720s school and the 1795 house together form an expanded campus known thereafter as Wallace Hall Academy.

=== 19th Century ===
In the early 19th century, Wallace Hall Academy gained recognition as a prominent educational institution. A parish survey conducted in 1817 described it as "one of the most celebrated academies" in Scotland. The curriculum included English, mathematics, and classical languages, attracting pupils from across the Nithsdale region.

In 1841 Craufurd Tait Ramage, himself a former pupil, was appointed vice-master, and in 1842 he succeeded Robert Mundell as rector on Mundell's death. That year significant renovations were carried out under the architect Walter Newall, who updated the 18th-century buildings with mullioned windows and a stair tower. Ramage personally contributed funds to improve the classrooms and the school's water supply and drainage.

Wallace Hall Academy maintained a balance between classical and practical education throughout the century. The curriculum included subjects such as agriculture—Rector Mundell introduced American timothy grass to the local area to enhance hay production, an innovation shared with the farming community. By the 1880s, the school also prepared girls for the Lady Literate in Arts diploma from St. Andrews University, as well as for civil service examinations. A five-year academic programme allowed some pupils to enter directly into the second year of university study, bypassing preliminary exams.

Following the Education (Scotland) Act 1872, Wallace Hall Academy came under review by the Endowed Schools Commission in 1875. The commission praised Wallace Hall’s headmaster (Dr. Ramage) as “a man of high character and great accomplishments”. The Commission noted, however, that “altered circumstances” required reform: elementary schooling was now handled by public schools, and Wallace Hall Academy's endowment income had grown to roughly £600/year, yielding a surplus beyond local needs. It recommended refocusing Wallace Hall on secondary education for a wider area, introducing nominal fees to encourage commitment, and using funds for scholarships and boarding accommodations to extend the school’s reach. These suggestions were implemented under the Endowed Institutions (Scotland) Act 1878, following which Wallace Hall Academy was designated a “higher class” school and placed under a new governance structure involving representatives from the local Presbytery, the School Board, the University of Glasgow, and others. At this time, the school served eleven parishes. Free education continued to be offered to children from the local area, while fees and bursaries supported other pupils.

=== 20th Century ===
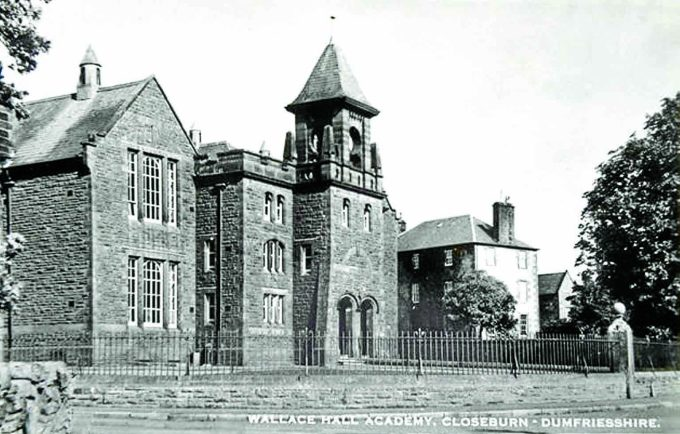
The 1911 Wallace Hall Academy, now Closeburn Primary School

In 1911, a new building was constructed in Closeburn, designed by architect James Barbour in the Jacobean Revival style. The new premises included science laboratories, spacious classrooms, and a bell tower. The original 18th-century buildings were repurposed, initially as a boarding hostel and later as a special residential school known as Closeburn House. The former academy and schoolhouse were listed at Category A in 1971. A bicentenary celebration was held in 1923 to mark the school's founding. After 1918, with the introduction of the Education (Scotland) Act 1918, Wallace Hall Academy became part of the Dumfriesshire education authority but retained its historical identity and endowment-funded bursaries.

Trees planted as a war memorial are recorded at the former academy site in Closeburn. Under the Local Government (Scotland) Act 1929, Wallace Hall Academy functioned as a state-aided senior secondary school, and the John Wallace Trust's role shifted largely to awarding bursaries and university scholarships to local pupils.

Between 1972 and 1973, coinciding with its 250 year anniversary, Wallace Hall merged with Morton Academy. A new campus was constructed in Thornhill, and the consolidated school opened there in 1978, providing a modern facility for secondary education in the area. A revised motto, "Working together to achieve more", was adopted at this time. The old Morton Academy building in Thornhill was subsequently repurposed as Wallace Hall Primary School. The former Closeburn site became Closeburn Primary School, and the building has been listed at Category B since 1971.

=== 21st Century ===
In 2005, Wallace Hall was selected to participate in Scotland’s Schools of Ambition programme, which promoted curricular innovation and whole-school improvement. Throughout this period, the academy restructured its senior phase courses (S4–S6), expanded subject offerings, and introduced a departmental leadership system. These reforms, aligned with the Curriculum for Excellence, were complemented by investment in ICT, including the development of a library resource centre and classroom technology upgrades.

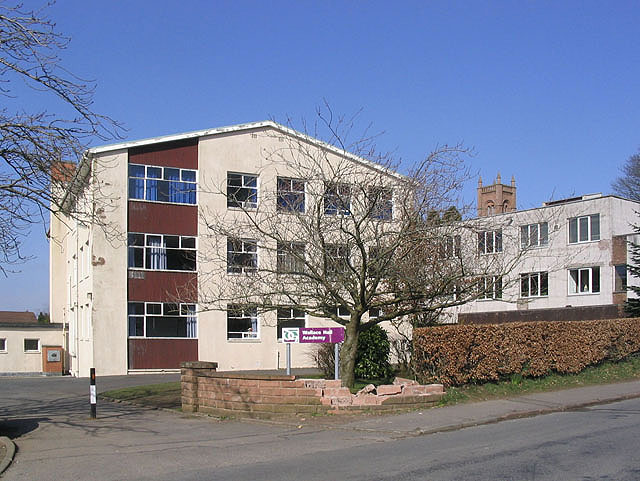
The former Wallace Hall Academy building (1978) in Thornhill.

Barry Graham became head teacher in 2008. Plans started for an all-through campus in 2007, and it opened in January 2010, integrating Wallace Hall's nursery, primary, and secondary departments into a single building. The campus includes science labs, workshops, sports facilities, a horticultural zone and a school orchard.

In 2023, Wallace Hall marked its 300th anniversary with a series of events and commemorations organised with the Wallace Hall Community Group. The Scottish Parliament also recorded the milestone in a congratulatory motion submitted by Emma Harper, MSP for South Scotland.

== Campus ==
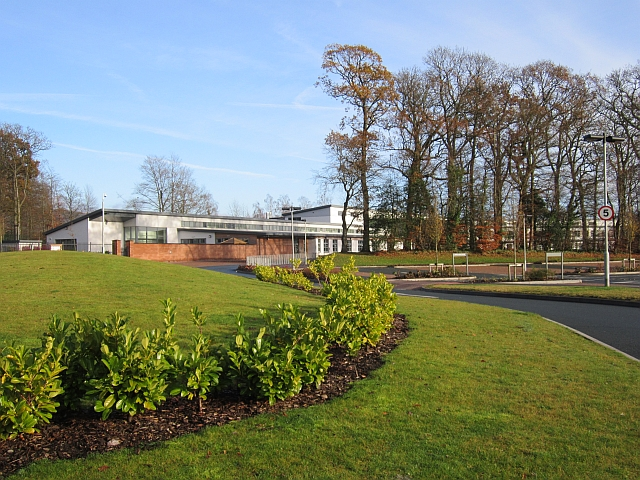
Current Wallace Hall building (2010), showing ELC and Primary wing.

The current Wallace Hall campus, opened in January 2010, is a purpose-built educational facility located in Thornhill, Dumfries and Galloway. It accommodates the school’s Early Learning Centre, primary school, and secondary school within a single complex, providing a continuous educational pathway for pupils aged 2 to 18. The campus includes dedicated areas for each educational stage and shared facilities such as science laboratories, technical workshops, music and art rooms, and a centrally located Library Resource Centre.

The school incorporates environmental and rural education into its curriculum, supported by on-site horticultural spaces, polytunnels, and an orchard. These resources are used in programmes such as the WHApples community orchard project, which involves pupils in sustainability and outdoor learning.

Sporting facilities at the campus include indoor sports halls, outdoor pitches, and an all-weather playing surface, enabling a broad range of physical education and extracurricular activities. The Library Resource Centre functions as a central hub for academic support, offering access to learning materials and ICT resources.

== Old School Thornhill project ==
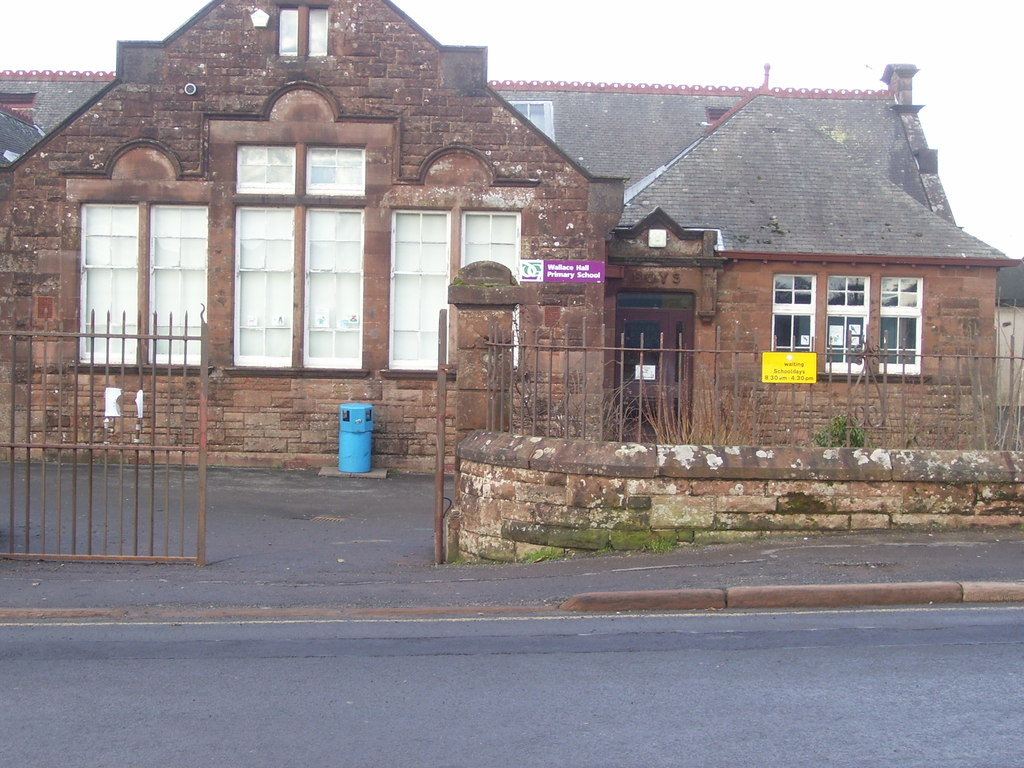
Wallace Hall Primary School in 2009

The former Morton Academy building in Thornhill, built in 1909 and listed at Category C, later housed Wallace Hall Primary School. After the primary school moved into the new campus opposite in 2010, the building stood empty. In July 2017 a community campaign began to buy and restore it. In June 2019 the campaign became a registered charity, Old School Thornhill, which bought the building in November 2019 with support from the Scottish Land Fund, the Architectural Heritage Fund and Thornhill Community Council. Further funding came from the Holywood Trust, Dumfries and Galloway Council and South of Scotland Enterprise, and the charity states that it raised more than £2.5 million in total. Renovation took place between 2022 and 2024, and the building opened to the public on 20 April 2024.

== Notable former pupils ==
- Aglionby Ross Carson, educator
- Andrew Coltart, European Tour golfer
- Thomas Gillespie, minister and Professor of Humanity at the University of St Andrews
- John Hunter, classicist and horticulturalist; a founding fellow of the Royal Society of Edinburgh and college principal at the University of St Andrews
- Leo Kearse, comedian
- Craufurd Tait Ramage, travel writer and anthologist; later rector of the school
- Emily Smith, Scottish folk singer
- Nicky Spence, opera singer
- Andrew Wallace Williamson, Moderator of the General Assembly of the Church of Scotland (1913–14), Dean of the Thistle and of the Chapel Royal in Scotland (1910–25)
