= Craufurd Tait Ramage =

Scottish writer (1803–1878)

Craufurd Tait Ramage (1803–1878) was a Scottish travel writer and anthologist.

== Life ==
Born at Annfield, Newhaven, Edinburgh, on 10 September 1803, Ramage was educated at Wallace Hall, Dumfriesshire, and at Edinburgh High School. He graduated M.A. at Edinburgh University in 1825.

While at university Ramage took private pupils, including Archibald Campbell Tait with whom he maintained a lifelong friendship. After leaving college he became tutor in the family of Sir Henry Lushington, 2nd Baronet, and spent three years with his pupils in Naples, also touring. His Nooks and By-Ways in Italy (1868) was based on a journey of 1828. For 15 years after his return to Scotland he was tutor in the family of Thomas Spring-Rice.

In 1841 Ramage was appointed vice-master of Wallace Hall Academy, and he succeeded, on the death of Robert Mundell, to the rectorship in 1842. He was nominated a justice of the peace for Dumfriesshire in 1848, and the degree of LL.D. was conferred on him by the university of Glasgow in 1852. He died at Wallace Hall on 29 November 1878. Ramage married Mary Paterson of Cheshire in 1839; they had five children.

== Works ==
Ramage published four anthologies, entitled Beautiful Thoughts: respectively "from Greek Authors, with English Translations, and Lives of the Authors", Liverpool, 1864; "from Latin Authors, with English Translations", Liverpool, 1864; 3rd edit. enlarged, 1877; "from French and Italian Authors, with English Translations and Lives of the Authors", Liverpool, 1866; "from German and Spanish Authors", Liverpool, 1868. Other works were:

- Defence of the Parochial Schools of Scotland, Edinburgh, 1854.
- The Nooks and Byways of Italy. Wanderings in Search of its Ancient Remains and Modern Superstitions, Liverpool, 1868. A new abridged edition was published in 1965, edited by Edith Clay. The book has been compared to later works by Keppel Craven and Arthur John Strutt.
- Drumlanrig Castle and the Douglases: with the Early History and Ancient Remains of Durisdeer, Closeburn, and Morton, Dumfries, 1876
- Bible Echoes in Ancient Classics, Edinburgh, 1878

He contributed to the Quarterly Journal of Education, the Penny Cyclopædia, and Encyclopædia Britannica, 7th edition.

== Notes ==
Attribution

This article incorporates text from a publication now in the public domain: Lee, Sidney, ed. (1896). "Ramage, Craufurd Tait". Dictionary of National Biography. Vol. 47. London: Smith, Elder & Co.
