= Samuel Wallace =

Recipient of the Victoria Cross (1892–1968)

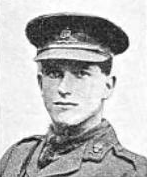
- Born: 7 March 1892; Thornhill, Dumfries and Galloway, Scotland
- Died: 2 February 1968 (aged 75); Moffat, Dumfries and Galloway, Scotland
- Burial place: Moffat Cemetery
- Military career
- Allegiance: United Kingdom
- Branch: British Army
- Rank: Captain
- Units: Royal Field Artillery
- Conflicts: World War I
- Awards: Victoria Cross

Samuel Thomas Dickson Wallace VC (7 March 1892 – 2 February 1968) was a Scottish recipient of the Victoria Cross, the highest and most prestigious award for gallantry in the face of the enemy that can be awarded to British and Commonwealth forces.

== Biography ==
Samuel Thomas Dickson Wallace was born in Thornhill on 7 March 1892. He was educated at Dumfries Academy and the University of Edinburgh.

He was 25 years old, and a temporary lieutenant in the "C" Battery 63rd Brigade, Royal Field Artillery, British Army during the First World War when the following deed took place for which he was awarded the VC:

On 30 November 1917 at Gonnelieu, France, when the personnel of Lieutenant Wallace's battery were reduced to five, having lost their commander and five sergeants, and were surrounded by enemy infantry, he maintained the firing of the guns by swinging the trails close together, the men running and loading from gun to gun. He was in action for eight hours firing the whole time and inflicting severe casualties on the enemy. Then, owing to the exhausted state of his men, he withdrew when the infantry supports arrived, taking with him all essential gun parts and all wounded. His guns were eventually recovered.

He later achieved the rank of captain.

Wallace died on 2 February 1968. He is buried in Moffat Cemetery, Dumfries and Galloway, Scotland on right side of main gate.

== The medal ==
His Victoria Cross is displayed at the Royal Artillery Museum, Woolwich, England.

== Bibliography ==
- Scotland's Forgotten Valour (Graham Ross, 1995)
- Gliddon, Gerald (2004) [2012]. VCs of the First World War: Cambrai 1917. The History Press. ISBN 978-0-75-247668-1.
