= Grennan Hill =

Hill and fort site in Dumfries and Galloway, Scotland

Coordinates: 55.2355°N 3.8489°W

Grennan Hill is the site of an Iron Age hill fort outside Penpont in Dumfries and Galloway, Scotland.
