= Scaur Water =

River in Dumfries and Galloway, Scotland

Coordinates: 55°14′N 3°48′W

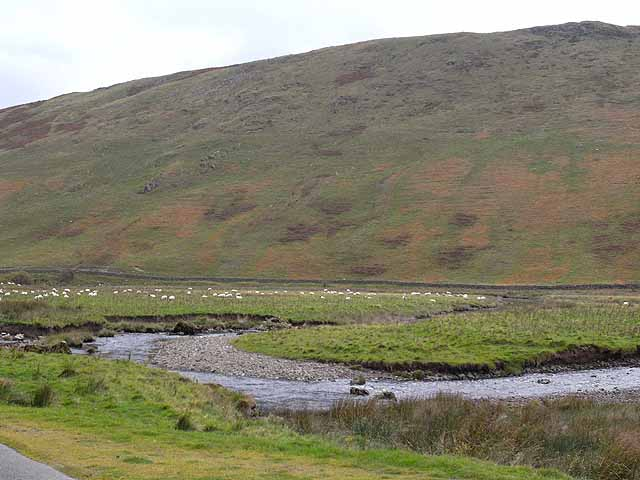
A meander on Scaur Water

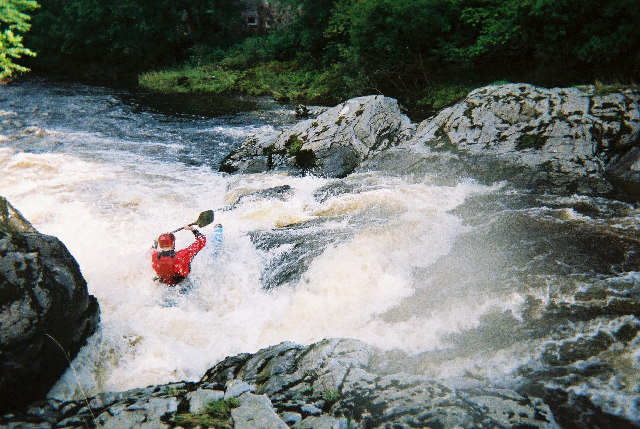
Water sports on Scaur Water.

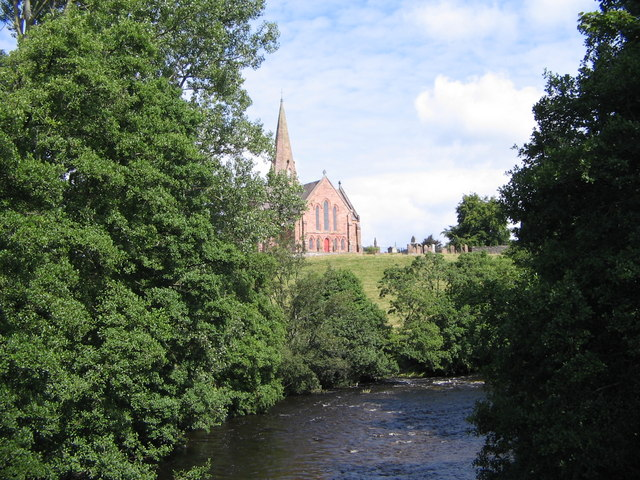
Scaur Water and Penpont Parish Church.

Scaur Water is a river which rises near Polskeoch in the Scaur hills in the region of Dumfries and Galloway, Scotland.

It flows from its source near Sanquhar in the Southern Uplands and joins the River Nith two miles southwest of Thornhill. The total length is 30 km (19 mi). During its course it descends from 500m to 55m altitude, and forms part of the boundary between Tynron and Keir Parishes.

In the river valley, the Scaur Glen, are several sculptures by Andy Goldsworthy and two hillforts, as well as the Chanlockfoot Site of Special Scientific Interest, a woodland of ash, sycamore, and wych elm trees.

The river is used for canoeing and trout fishing, especially at the Glenmarlin Falls near Penpont. A local legend tells of the ghosts of a horse and rider who drowned in a deep pool, known colloquially as the Black Hole, at the bottom of the falls.
