= Penpont =

Village in Dumfries and Galloway, Scotland

Coordinates: 55.232°N 3.815°W

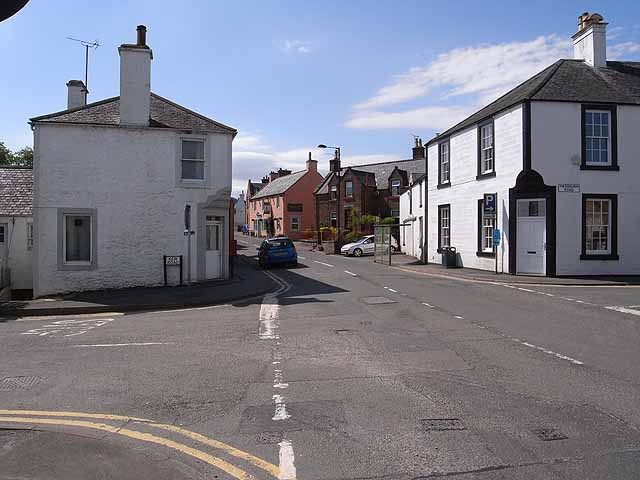
- Crossroads at the centre of Penpont

- Location within Dumfries and Galloway
- OS grid reference: NX8494
- Civil parish: Penpont
- Council area: Dumfries and Galloway
- Lieutenancy area: Dumfries
- Country: Scotland
- Sovereign state: United Kingdom
- Post town: Thornhill
- Postcode district: DG3
- Dialling code: 01848
- Police: Scotland
- Fire: Scottish
- Ambulance: Scottish
- UK Parliament: Dumfriesshire, Clydesdale and Tweeddale
- Scottish Parliament: Dumfriesshire

Penpont is a village about 2 miles (3 km) west of Thornhill in Dumfriesshire, in the Dumfries and Galloway region of Scotland. It is near the confluence of the Shinnel Water and Scaur Water rivers in the foothills of the Southern Uplands. It has a population of about 400 people.

== Archaeology ==
There are several archaeological sites nearby, including Late Bronze Age hill forts on Tynron Doon and Grennan Hill and a long cairn at Capenoch Loch dating from the 2nd or 3rd century.

== History ==
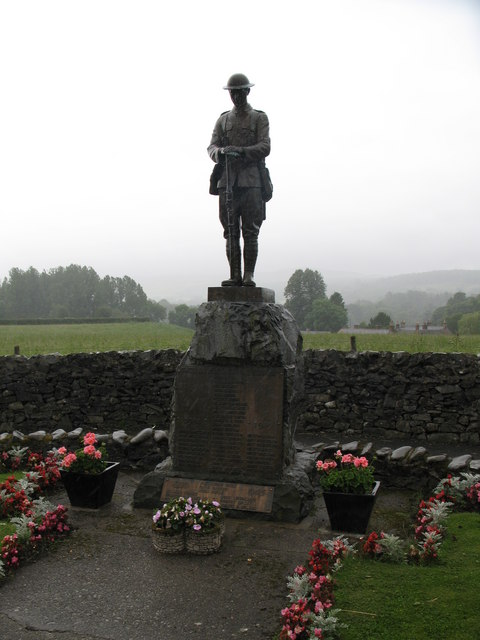
Penpont war memorial

The toponym Penpont means "head of [the] bridge" or "bridge-end" in the Cumbric language once spoken in the region.

The A702 road passes through Penpont. West of Thornhill it crosses the River Nith on a two-arched stone bridge in Penpont parish. It was built in the 1760s after the presbytery of Penpont raised £680 toward the cost. Work started about 1774, but in 1776 the bridge collapsed. The bridge was completed in 1778 and strengthened in 1930–31. It is a Category A listed building.

Penpont's Church of Scotland parish church is a Gothic Revival building completed in 1867. It is a Category B listed building. It has an Art Nouveau Communion table made in 1923.

Penpont's war memorial was made by Glasgow sculptor William Kellock Brown and installed in 1920. It is a bronze statue of an infantryman, with his rifle pointing downwards, his hands resting on the butt and his head slightly bowed.

== Notable people ==
- Sir Hugh Steuart Gladstone FRSE FZS (1877-1949) civil servant and ornithologist, Lord Lieutenant of Dumfries, lived at Capenoch House in Penpont.
- Joseph Thomson (1858–95), the geologist and explorer after whom Thomson's Gazelle is named, was born in Penpont.
- The sculptor Andy Goldsworthy has lived in the village since 1986 and has a workshop there. Many of his works are in the surrounding countryside, including a pinecone-shaped sculpture at Stepends Farm made to celebrate the year 2000. Each year Penpont holds a week-long festival called the Penpont Gala, beginning in the first week of July.
- Kirkpatrick MacMillan, generally credited with the invention of the pedal driven bicycle, was born and died in Keir, one mile south of Penpont.
- Leo Kearse Comedian and broadcaster
- Joanna Lumley owns a cottage near the village.
- Hugh McMillan (poet) born 1955

== See also ==
- Drumlanrig Castle
- Tibbers Castle
- Kirkbride, Durisdeer
