= John Hunter (classicist) =

Scottish classicist and horticulturalist

John Hunter FRSE (7 September 1746 – 18 January 1837) was a Scottish classicist and horticulturalist. In 1783 he was a joint founder of the Royal Society of Edinburgh.

== Life ==
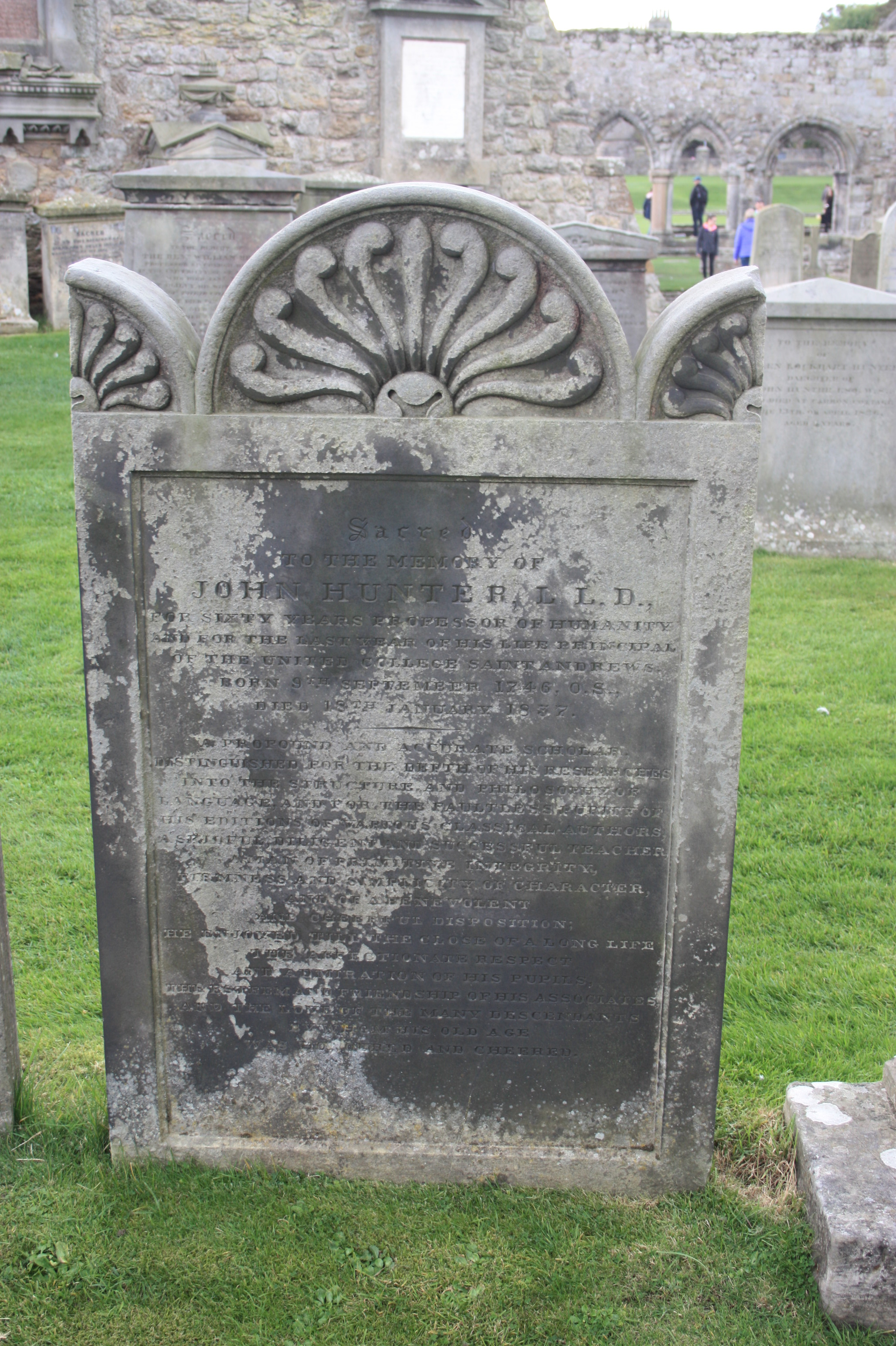
The grave of Prof John Hunter, St Andrews Cathedral Churchyard

Hunter was born in Closeburn, Dumfries and Galloway on 7 September 1746. He was educated nearby at Wallace Hall School. He was then attended the University of Edinburgh, graduation with an MA in 1768.

His first role was as private secretary to Lord Monboddo. In 1775 he then accepted the role of Professor of Humanity at the United College in University of St Andrews, continuing in this role until 1826. In 1826 (aged 80) he took on the role of Principal of the twin colleges of St Leonards and St Salvators at the University.

The University of Edinburgh awarded him an honorary doctorate (LLD) in later life.

He died at St Andrews on 18 January 1837, and is buried in St Andrews Cathedral churchyard.

== Family ==
He married twice, firstly around 1770 to Elizabeth Miln and together they had a son, James Hunter (1772-1845) who was Professor of Logic and Rhetoric at St Andrews University. He was also minister of St Leonards Church in St Andrews.

On the death of Elizabeth, Hunter married Margaret Hadow.
