= Leo Kearse =

Scottish comedian (born 1976)

- Born: Leo Hamilton-Kearse; 17 July 1976 (age 50); Penpont, Dumfriesshire, Scotland
- Education: Wallace Hall
- Alma mater: University of Stirling

Leo Kearse (born Leo Hamilton-Kearse, 17 July 1976) is a comedian and broadcaster from Scotland. His stand-up comedy routines have earned him the Scottish Comedian of the Year award and UK Pun Champion. A self-professed right-wing comedian, Kearse regularly appears on GB News.

== Background ==
Kearse was born on 17 July 1976 and grew up in Penpont in Dumfriesshire. He attended Wallace Hall school. After graduating from the University of Stirling, Kearse worked as a criminal intelligence analyst then as a consultant in national security and government.

== Comedy ==
Kearse is known for being a right-wing comedian. He covers anti-woke issues, such as cancel culture and alleged left-wing bias at the BBC.

He was a New Comedian Of 2011 finalist at the Leicester Square Theatre and a finalist of the Laughing Horse New Act Of The Year Final 2012. He then won the Chelmsford Comedian of the Year in 2012.

Kearse was crowned the UK Pun Champion in 2015 after he beat off competition from fellow comedians Rob Thomas and reigning champion Darren Walsh. Leo won the contest with such jokes as "I was in hospital last week. I asked the nurse if I could do my own stitches. She said 'suture self' and "Growing up on a farm, my dad was always telling me to use the indoor toilet. But I preferred to go against the grain".

After being awarded runner-up in 2016, he won the Scottish Comedian of the Year award in 2017.

His breakthrough show Right Wing Comedian was cancelled by the Court Hotel venue at the Perth Fringe World in Australia in 2019 after his material was accused of being transphobic.

=== Selected comedy shows ===
| Title | Year | Notes |
|---|---|---|
| Leo And Stephen Go Down On You | 2012 | With Stephen Bailey |
| Am I Right? | 2013 | |
| The Mangina Funalogs | 2014 | |
| I Can Make You Tory | 2017 | |
| Right-Wing Comedian | 2018 | |
| Transgressive | 2019 | |
| Cancel Culture | 2021 | |

== Politics ==
Kearse has criticised the Scottish National Party, Scottish independence and the Scottish Hate Crime Act.

The latter issue led him to become a Reclaim Party candidate in the 2021 Scottish Parliament election. Kearse stated that "With wokeness and extreme nationalism seemingly the only acceptable discourses allowed in Scotland these days, I feel now is the right time to stand up and be counted." He stood in Glasgow Pollok held by Humza Yousaf where he received 114 votes (0.3%). He also stood on the Glasgow regional list where he received 174 votes (0.1%)

== Media ==
Kearse is a GB News presenter appearing on the Headliners programme and presents his own show Saturday Night Showdown. He also appeared as a guest on Good Morning Britain where he defended the principle of free speech.

He is a co-host of the 3 Speech podcast with fellow comedians Darius Davies and Nico Yearwood.

Kearse has written opinion pieces for The New Zealand Herald, The Independent and The Sun newspapers.
