= Thornhill, Dumfries and Galloway =

Village in rural lowland Scotland

Coordinates: 55.239°N 3.767°W

Thornhill: Scottish Gaelic: Bàrr na Driseig
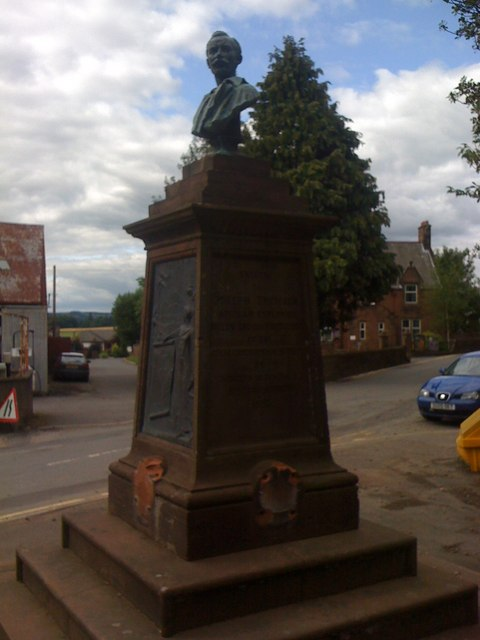
- Monument to Joseph Thomson

- Location within Dumfries and Galloway
- Population: 1,670 (2020)
- OS grid reference: NX877954
  - Edinburgh: 54 mi (87 km)
  - London: 298 mi (480 km)
- Council area: Dumfries and Galloway
- Lieutenancy area: Dumfries
- Country: Scotland
- Sovereign state: United Kingdom
- Post town: Thornhill
- Postcode district: DG3
- Dialling code: 01848
- Police: Scotland
- Fire: Scottish
- Ambulance: Scottish
- UK Parliament: Dumfriesshire, Clydesdale and Tweeddale
- Scottish Parliament: Dumfriesshire

Thornhill (Scottish Gaelic: Bàrr na Driseig) is a village in the Mid Nithsdale area of Dumfries and Galloway, Scotland, south of Sanquhar and north of Dumfries on the main A76 road. Thornhill sits in the Nithsdale valley with the Carsphairn and Scaur range to the west and the Lowther hills to the east. It was initially a small village, planned and built in 1717 on the Queensberry Estate on the road linking Dumfries to Glasgow. The Earl of Queensberry initially named the village 'New Dalgarnock' however the name did not achieve popular approval.

The village is primarily comprised a grid pattern with the main street of Drumlanrig Street (the A76), East and West Morton Streets, New Street, Townhead Street Station Road, Corstorphine road, and Gill Road (the A702).

The village is near Drumlanrig Castle, a 17th-century turreted mansion once the ancient Douglas stronghold, now home to the Duke of Buccleuch and Queensberry. The grounds contain Tibbers Castle which was founded in the 12th or 13th century.

The most recently published Census data from 2001 recorded the population at 1,512 inhabitants.

== Public Transport ==
The village's bus service is operated by the South West of Scotland Transport Partnership (SWESTRANS) incorporating a number of local and national operators.

Thornhill railway station, closed in 1965, is on the old Glasgow and South Western main line from Carlisle and Dumfries to Kilmarnock and Glasgow. The nearest train stations are located in Dumfries or Sanquhar.

In 2016 the local community council distributed a survey, and residents showed overwhelming support of the re-opening of the station. Recently a community action plan was released, which outlined the next steps for village development, and the station's redevelopment is a current goal for the village.

== Education ==
The rebuilt school gained its name, Wallace Hall, on amalgamation with the nearby Closeburn school of that name. The original Closeburn school was founded in 1723 by John Wallace, a merchant in Glasgow and native of Closeburn.

Wallace Hall Primary School and its Nursery moved into a new building in January 2010, as part of a shared campus with Academy.

Alumni include the golfer Andrew Coltart, Bobby Black (Scottish League internationalist and Scottish League Cup winning footballer and also all England bowls champion) is also from Thornhill. Colin Peacock, a long serving Scottish International Bowler and Commonwealth Games representative in 2006. Swimmer Moira Brown represented Scotland in the Commonwealth Games and Great Britain in the 1972 Munich Olympics as well as several other internationals.

== Notable residents ==
A monument to the explorer Joseph Thomson (after whom the Thomson's Gazelle is named), who lived in neighbouring Penpont and Gatelawbridge, can be found close to the school. There is also a column topped by a winged horse, the emblem of the Queensberry family, in the centre of the town.

The Very Reverend Dr James Harkness, first non-Anglican Chaplain-General of the UK Armed Forces and Moderator of the General Assembly of the Church of Scotland in 1995, is from Thornhill.

Helen Armstrong, née Hyslop worked for thirty years at the Buccleuch Arms as a cook. She is said to have been an illegitimate daughter of Robert Burns and Helen Hyslop from Moffat.

Samuel Wallace, a Victoria Cross recipient, was born in the town. A plaque was placed by the Thomson memorial

John McLachan (architect) (1843–1893) was born here.

Joseph Laing Waugh, an author, was born and raised here.

Andrew Coltart, a professional golfer with one Ryder Cup cap was born and learned his trade here.

== Amenities ==
Thornhill has a bowling green, a squash court, a football field, and a golf course, and is known for fishing in the nearby River Nith and tributaries.

Thornhill also features a wide variety of retail outlets, such as clothes boutiques, chinese takeaway, cafes, pubs, food stores, a large pharmacy, an ironmonger, butcher, an electrical retailer, gift shops and a hairdressers. The large Victorian post office stands on the north side of the town, along with a Royal Mail sorting office which serves a large rural area. There is also a garage and a small backstreet filling station. The town also has a public wash rooms, and a small cottage hospital.

== Thornhill Music Festival ==
Beginning in 2012, Thornhill Music Festival has grown into an annual community event, with regular attendees from all over the UK coming each year. The festival has grown each year thanks to the help of the local community, the committee, the venues, and other participants.

This Festival was started by The Lewis Hamilton Band who noticed a steady decline in available live music, and so in 2012 they decided to put on something similar to the established and successful Blues Festivals such as Shetland, Arbroath, Callander and in particular Montrose (they played at all of them several times), where all the bands are paid directly by the venues, but differing in that they wanted to broaden the musical scope. All venues apart from the Bowling Club are free entry all weekend.

From 2018, with the assistance of funding received from National Lottery Awards, Thornhill Music Festival is planning on bringing the music so enjoyed in the village venues, to those who are unable to attend. With the agreement of the local school, Wallace Hall, they plan to provide the music to both the Dementia Group at the Friendship Club and also to Briary Park Old People's home. In 2018, the Festival launched their own website.

== See also ==
- Dalgarnock Village, Church and Parish
- Nith Bridge cross
- Closeburn, Dumfries and Galloway
