= Tynron Doon =

Iron Age hill fort in Dumfries and Galloway, Scotland

Coordinates: 55.2254°N 3.8570°W

Tynron Doon is a multivallate Iron Age hill fort outside the village of Tynron in Dumfries and Galloway, Scotland. It was occupied on and off from the 1st millennium BC until the 16th century, when an L-shaped tower house stood there.

Tynron Doon lies at the southern end of the Scaur hills. It is 0.7 miles (1.1 km) northeast of Tynron, and 15 miles (24 km) northwest of Dumfries.

== Description ==
The original site is thought to be a multivallate hill fort dating to the Iron Age, of much the same plan as the modern (20th C.) remains.

The site is itself a spur hill of Auchengibbert Hill, and reaches 289 metres (948 ft) in height. The summit has an approximately oval plateau, of 40 by 45 metres (131 by 148 ft) in extent. The fort was built in a natural defensive position defended by steep slopes on the north, south and east sides. The western approach was made defensive by the addition of three ditches and two ramparts, with some of the ditches rock-cut.

In the 15th century the hill was the site of one of nine beacons maintained by the Sheriffs of Nithsdale and Annandale.

In the late medieval era (c. 16th C.) an L-shaped tower house was built in the northwest corner of the central area, with a floor plan of roughly 20 by 42 feet (6.1 by 12.8 m); a smaller 8 by 10 feet (2.4 by 3.0 m) extension to the northwest is speculated to have been a tower stair.

The tower house is thought to have been demolished between 1700 and 1750, used to build the church in Tynron (Tynron Kirk) and a barmkin wall fortification enclosing the summit may have been added in around the same period.

A hut circle dating to the 18th/19th C. is thought to have been a shepherd's bothy.

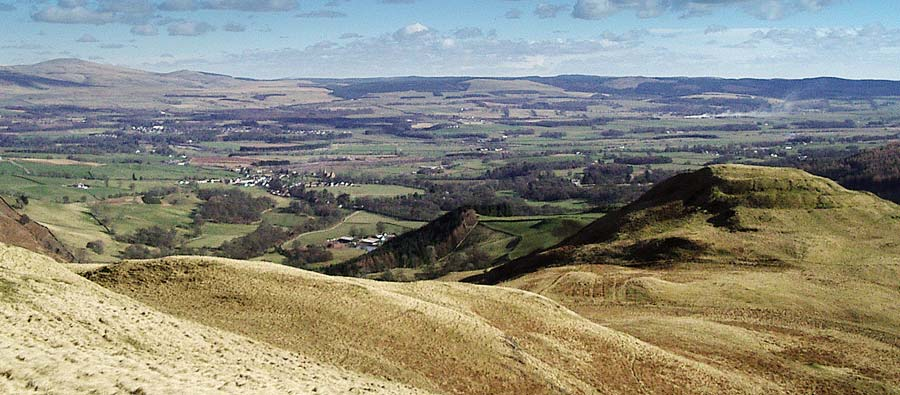
Tynron Doon (on the right) viewed from Auchengibbert Hill with the valley of the River Nith (Nithsdale) beyond and Queensberry Hill near the left side of the picture. The village of Penpont can be seen in the foreground and Thornhill lies beyond it.
