= Tynron =

Village in Dumfries and Galloway, Scotland

Coordinates: 55°12′58″N 3°52′42″W

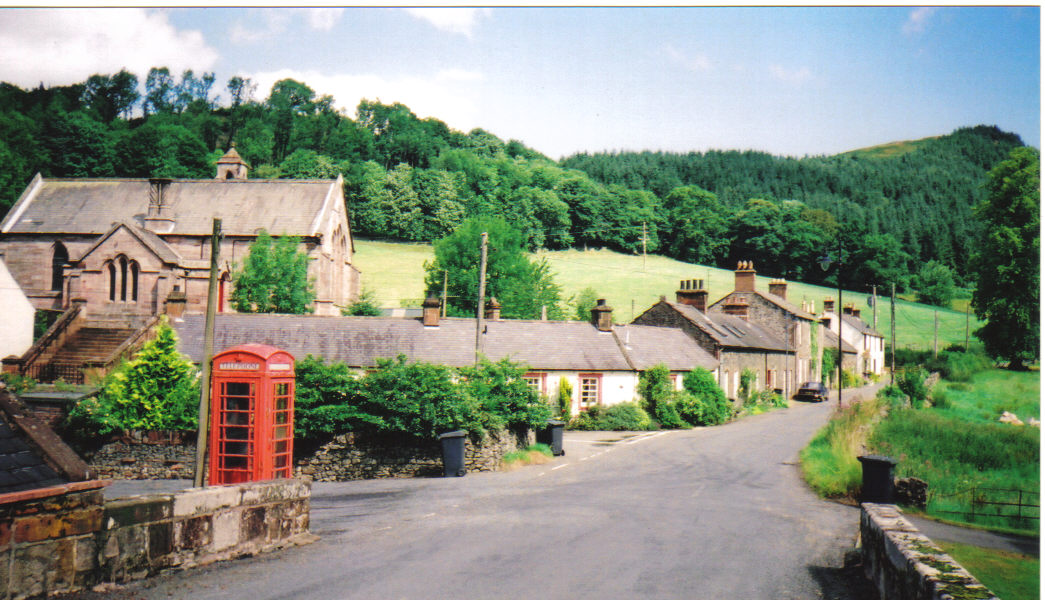
Tynron

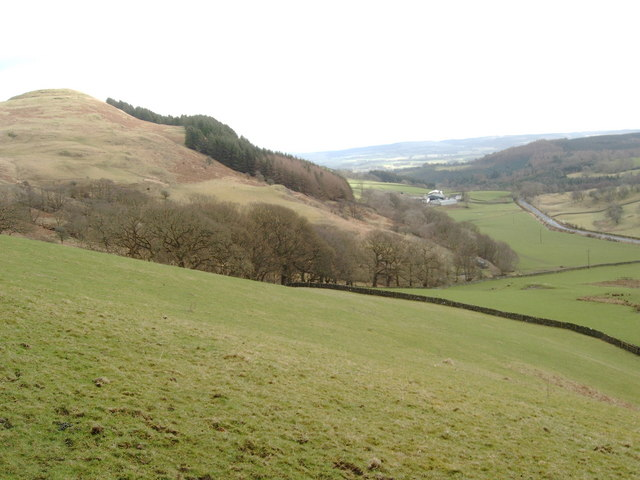
Tynron Doon on left.

Tynron is a village and civil parish located in Dumfries and Galloway, in south-west Scotland. It lies in a hollow along the Shinnel Water, approximately 2 miles (3.2 km) from the village of Moniaive.

The area is notable for Tynron Doon, the site of a Roman Iron Age hillfort, where remnants of ditches and ramparts are still visible.

The name Tynron is believed to derive from the Cumbric elements din rhón, meaning "lance-fort".

== Notable people ==
- James Shaw, Schoolmaster and Writer
- Rev Prof James Williamson (1725–1795) mathematician, joint founder of the Royal Society of Edinburgh
