= Coldstream Mill =

Mill in North Ayrshire, Scotland

Coldstream Mill, Beith
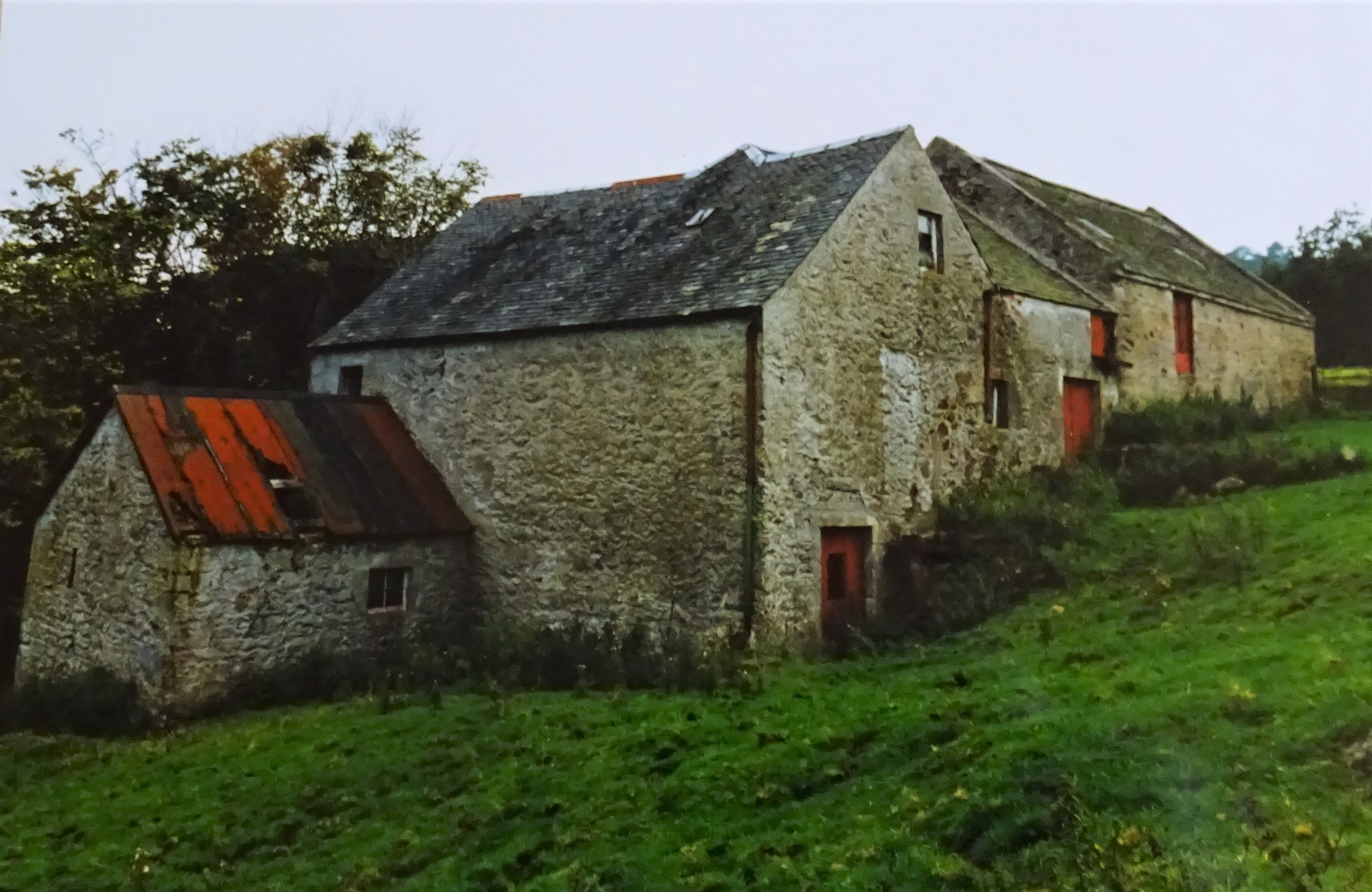
- Coldstream Mill
- Interactive map of Coldstream Mill, Beith

Origin
- Mill name: Coldstream
- Mill location: Beith, North Ayrshire
- Grid reference: NS385544
- Coordinates: 55.7561°N 4.5742°W
- Operator: Disused
- Year built: Early 19th Century

Information
- Purpose: Meal mill
- Type: Watermill
- Storeys: Two
- No. of pairs of millstones: 3

Coldstream Mill, near Beith in North Ayrshire, Scotland, was an early 19th century meal mill powered by the Dusk Water and Whitestone Burn that was enlarged from an existing much earlier watermill. The mill worked until 1991 and was the last traditional working water mill in Ayrshire and one of the last continuously worked watermills in Scotland. The mill buildings have been converted into a private dwelling and the mill pond has been retained.

== History ==
Coldstream Mill was built to serve the Barony and castle of Hessilhead. It was officially known on the deeds as Whitestone Mill in the Lands of Coldstream. The circa 1602 Timothy Pont map issued by Blaeu in 1654 shows a Whitstammil (sic).

=== The mill ===
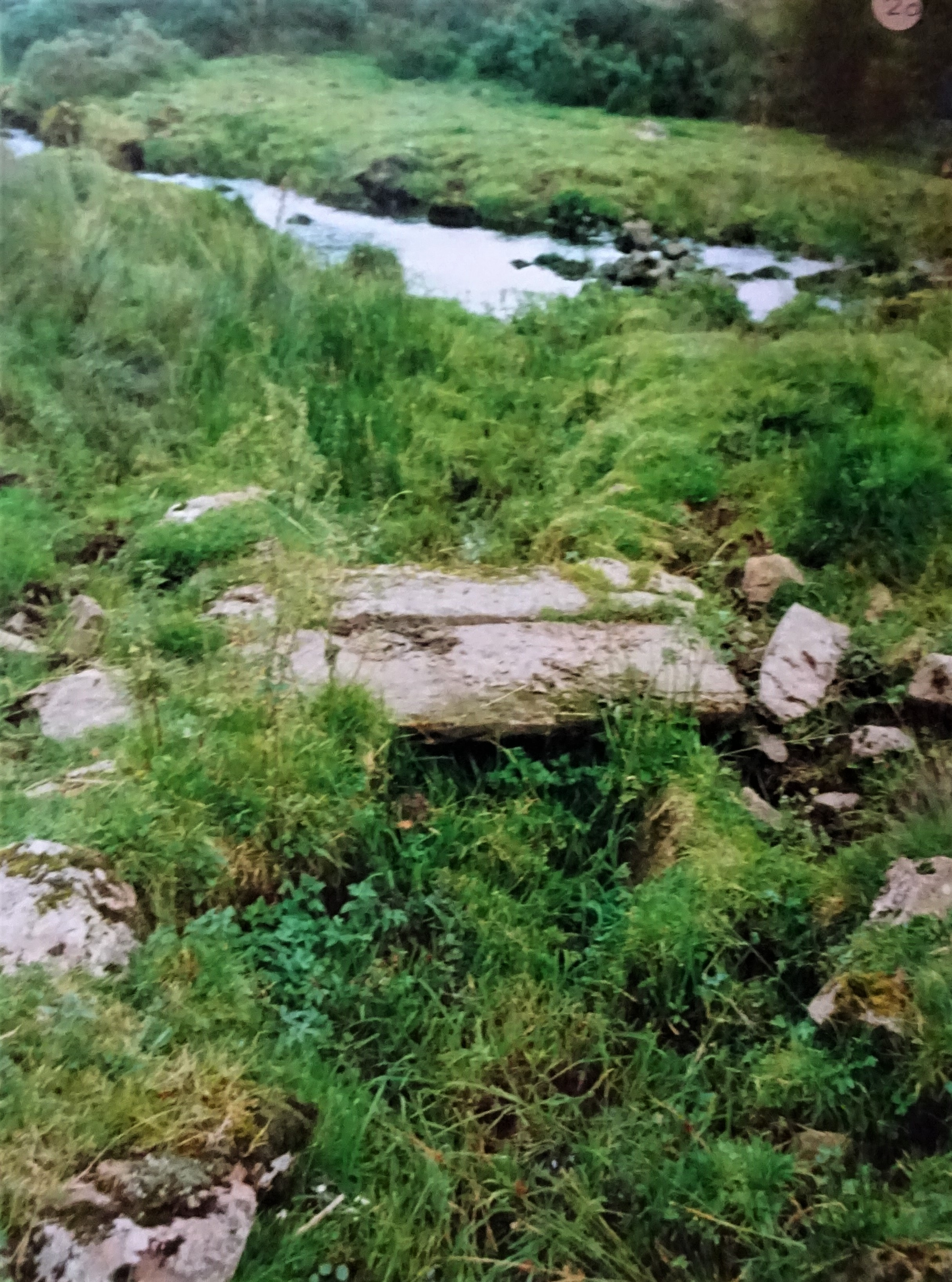
The marker stones on the millpond lade.

Coldstream was not mentioned in legal papers until 1728, but it may have been enlarged and improved circa 1673, as part of the general improvements in the barony carried out by Francis Montgomerie of Giffin for his son John's marriage, extending nearby Hessilhead Castle to become what was for a long time reckoned to be the best house in the district. John Montgomerie married Lady Margaret Carmichael, daughter of the Earl of Hyndford. John became Governor of New York. However, he accumulated a number of debts and he was forced to sell the barony in 1722.

In 1820, George Robertson comments on the excellent lands of Cauldstream (sic), which lay in the Barony of Hessilhead. Most rural mills at the time only had a single set of millstones. However, the space between the stones in these mills was adjustable to cater for shelling or mealing.

== Infrastructure ==
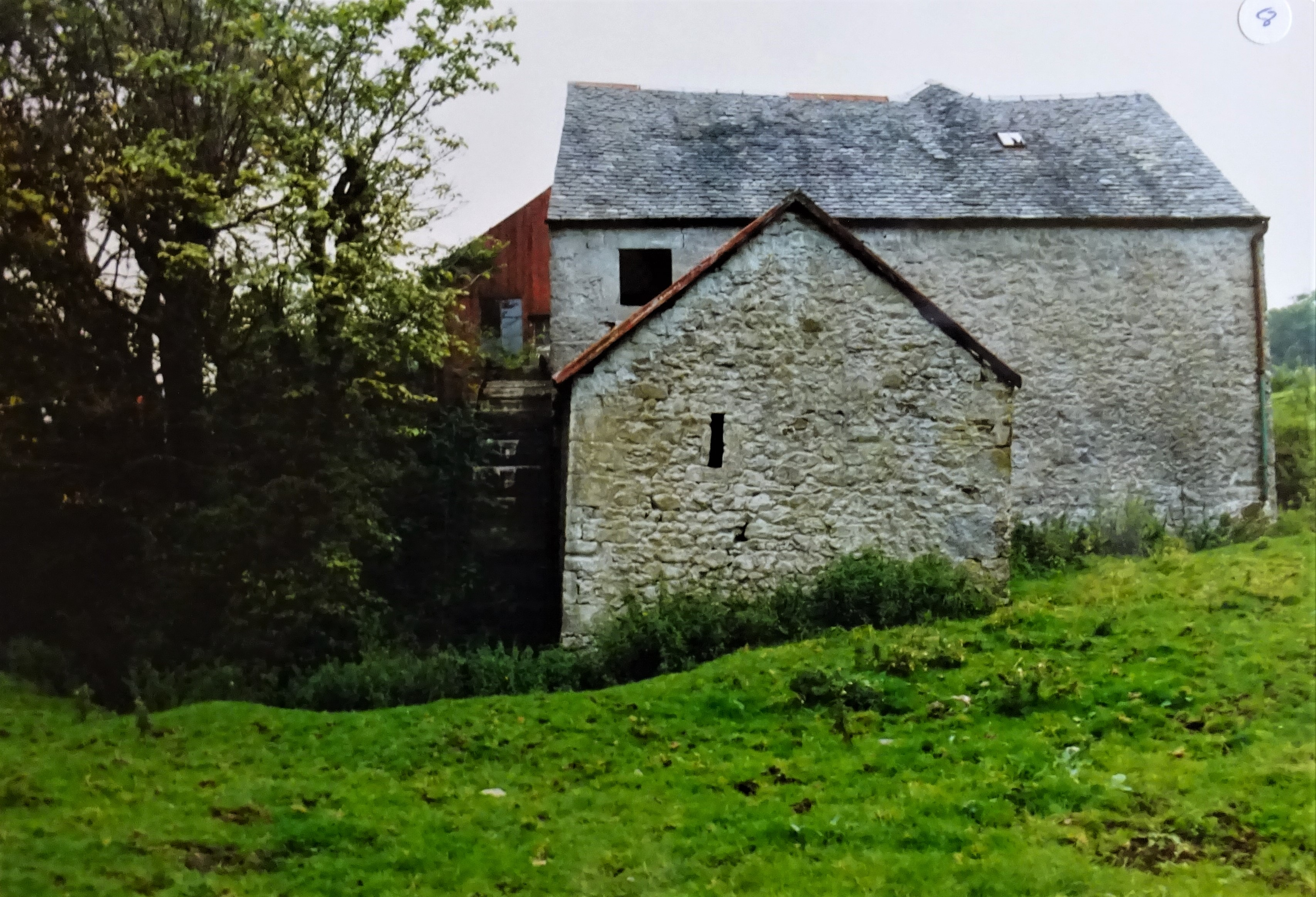
The mill and waterwheel in 1998

Originally, only two separate rubble-built buildings were present on this sloping site, later joined together by rubble-built walls. The 2-storey mill of the early 19th century was built on a 'L' plan and had three millstones. A single-storey rubble-built building extended off the millstone floor to the south-east and a larger wooden storeshed once stood alongside the upper kiln building with the lade running through a culvert beneath it. The provision of a kiln was an early development; it had an air vent running along the roof apex to allow heat and gases to escape.

Areas of rubble-built walls topped by brickwork show that some of the buildings were heightened and various changes were made in floor levels. The south-east annex extension blocked a large well built arch that had originally been a point of access for carts taking away processed meal from the machinery floor or bringing in sacks to be milled via an access track.

Coldstream was powered by water from a large mill pond fed from the minor Whitestone Burn and the more substantial Glazert Water, which, together provided a reliable source of water year round. The waterwheel, 3 ft 6in wide by 20 ft in diameter, was an overshot design with eight spokes of cast iron and had a wood lining, with wood awes or buckets. A well constructed dressed ashlar 'splash wall' lay behind the waterwheel with sufficient strength, etc. to withstand the water movements and the turning motion of the wheel that was usually six revolutions per minute. The wheel carried no maker's plate, but an item of interest is the repair of a fracture using four bolts and a square plate.

The common axle, the main drive for the millstones, had 136 'sacrificial' teeth that were traditionally made from lignum vitae. However, due to increasing costs, they were progressively replaced, as required, by exceptionally hard wood alternatives such as beech or hornbeam that were grown in the local hedgerows for this purpose. The non-native hornbeam is usually rare in rural districts, but several still grow near Coldstream. The purpose of these wooden teeth was to replace integral cast iron teeth that would be much harder and more expensive to replace if the water wheel suddenly seized due to an obstruction or if any other sudden excessive force was exerted. The company Howie of Dunlop produced the teeth specially for the mill.

=== The millers ===
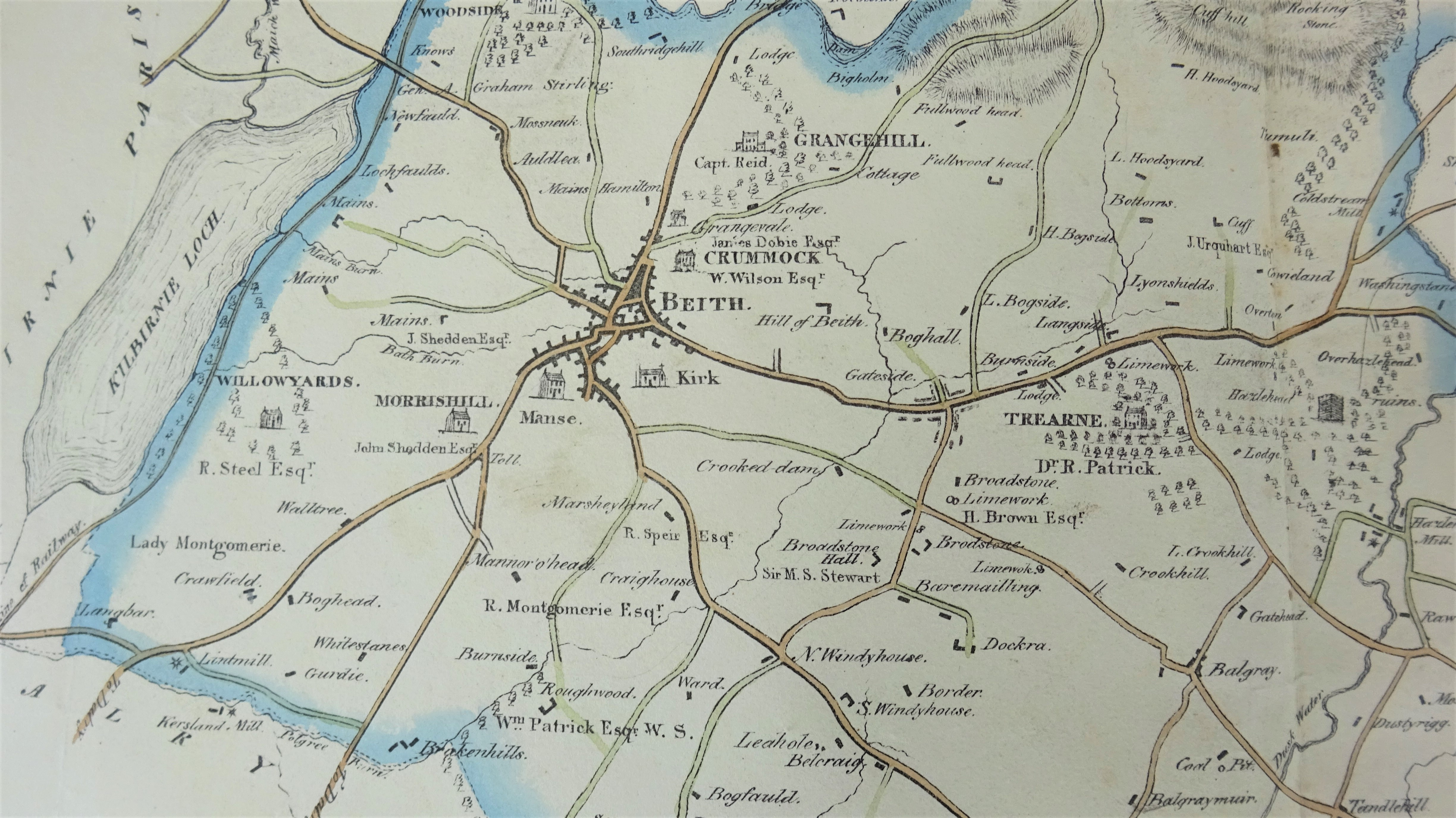
Robert Aitken's map of the Hessilhead area in 1829.

John Andrew is listed in 1782 as the heir to John Miller, his grandfather, a miller in Coldstream. In 1810, the mill passed to William Fulton of Beith, who sold it in 1815 to David Kerr, a merchant of Beith, and Andrew Gibson, a baker. William Caldwell then purchased the mill, and it remained with the Caldwell family for the next hundred years. Thomas Caldwell was the miller in 1841, but by 1871 Thomas was farming, and the miller was Robert Jack. David Fergie was the miller in 1881, Thomas having retired. By 1891, Robert Jack became the miller again and the sons of Thomas, William and Thomas, were the owners.

In 1921, the Smith family bought the mill from Thomas Caldwell, Joseph Smith was the miller from 1911 until 1954. Andrew Smith, son of Joseph, then worked Coldstream Mill until 1991 when he suffered a stroke. Joseph had been a ploughman, however he had cousins who were millers at Perceton and Cunninghamhead mills.

== Workings details ==
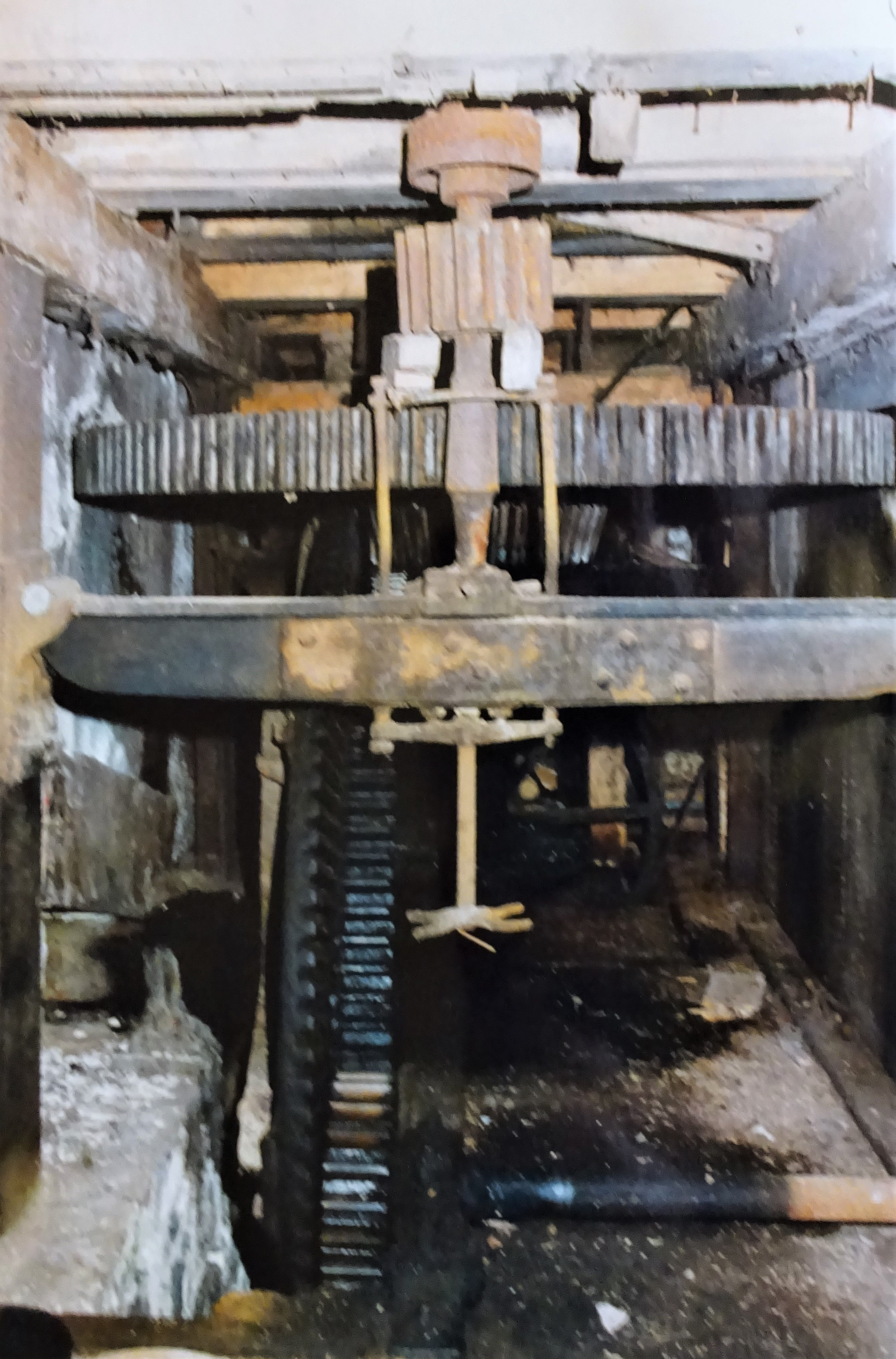
The millstone drive gear

Marked on old maps as a corn mill, after being enlarged, Coldstream Mill was mainly involved in preparing animal feed or meals, grinding linseed cake, beans, maize and barley. The mill had three sets of millstones, usually with two working whilst one was being dressed, that is serviced and sharpened, on a three week cycle. The Marshal family, blacksmiths at nearby Gateside, annealed the tools used to dress the stones. The millstones could be operated as a set of three, two or only a single set of stones. The mill never had an electricity supply and never needed any auxiliary power by steam or diesel engine due to the large mill pond and the plentiful water supply.

Generally, the animal feed was delivered by train to Lugton station from Glasgow Docks and then carried to Coldstream by cart. The finished meal was delivered by donkey cart to local farms as required. During WW2 the mill was in full-time operation.

A small copse of mature trees was a long-term feature that was necessary to prevent the wooden buckets and lining from warping in the heat of the summer months when the mill was inactive due to the plentiful summer pastures and therefore, meal feed demand was low.

=== The mill pond ===
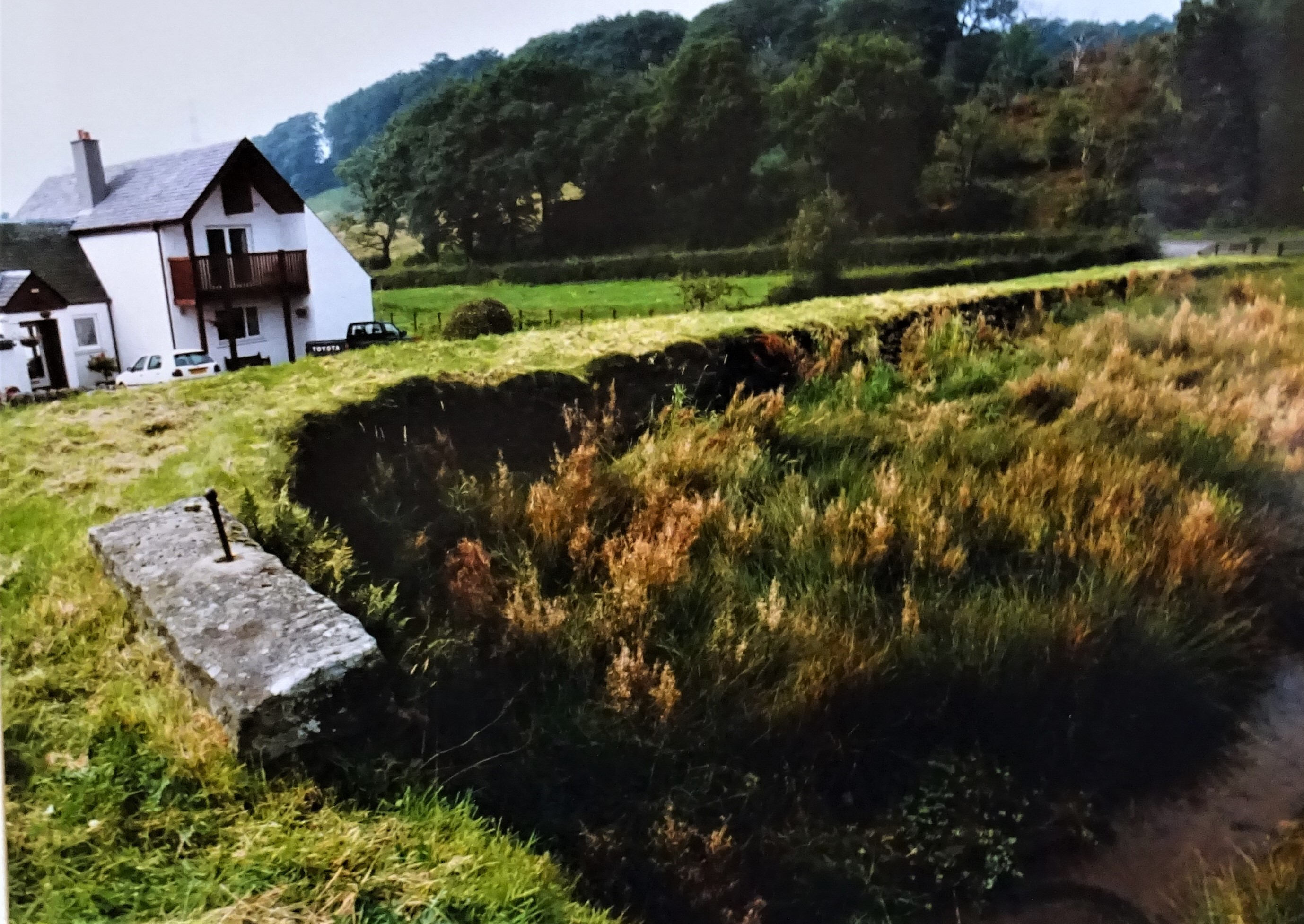
The mill pond and dam wall.

The Whitestone Burn and the Dusk Water powered the mill via the mill pond and the sluice control gear. No weir was present in the Dusk Water with only a few large boulders directing the current into the lake. A pair of stones across the lake indicated the point where the water level was sufficient for a day's milling. A board was dropped between the stones to prevent further water flow in order to prevent undue stress on the mill pond's extensive walls. The mill pond is unusual in the height and length of the dam walls that run parallel to the mill access lane. The greatest depth was 1.8 metres and an overflow sluice led to a laden that emptied into the Dusk Water.

== Remnants and legacy ==
Some of the items from the mill are on display at the nearby Dalgarven Mill museum near Kilwinning. As stated, the mill was converted into a private house and the mill pond has been preserved as part of this development. The waterwheel remains as a feature and a millstone has been preserved internally.

== See also ==
- Barburgh Mill, Closeburn
- Dalgarven Mill, Kilwinning
- Enterkinfoot Mill
- Millmannoch, Coylton
- Meikle Millbank Mill
- Nether Mill
