= Hessilhead Loch =

Coordinates: 55°44′48.5″N 4°34′53.7″W

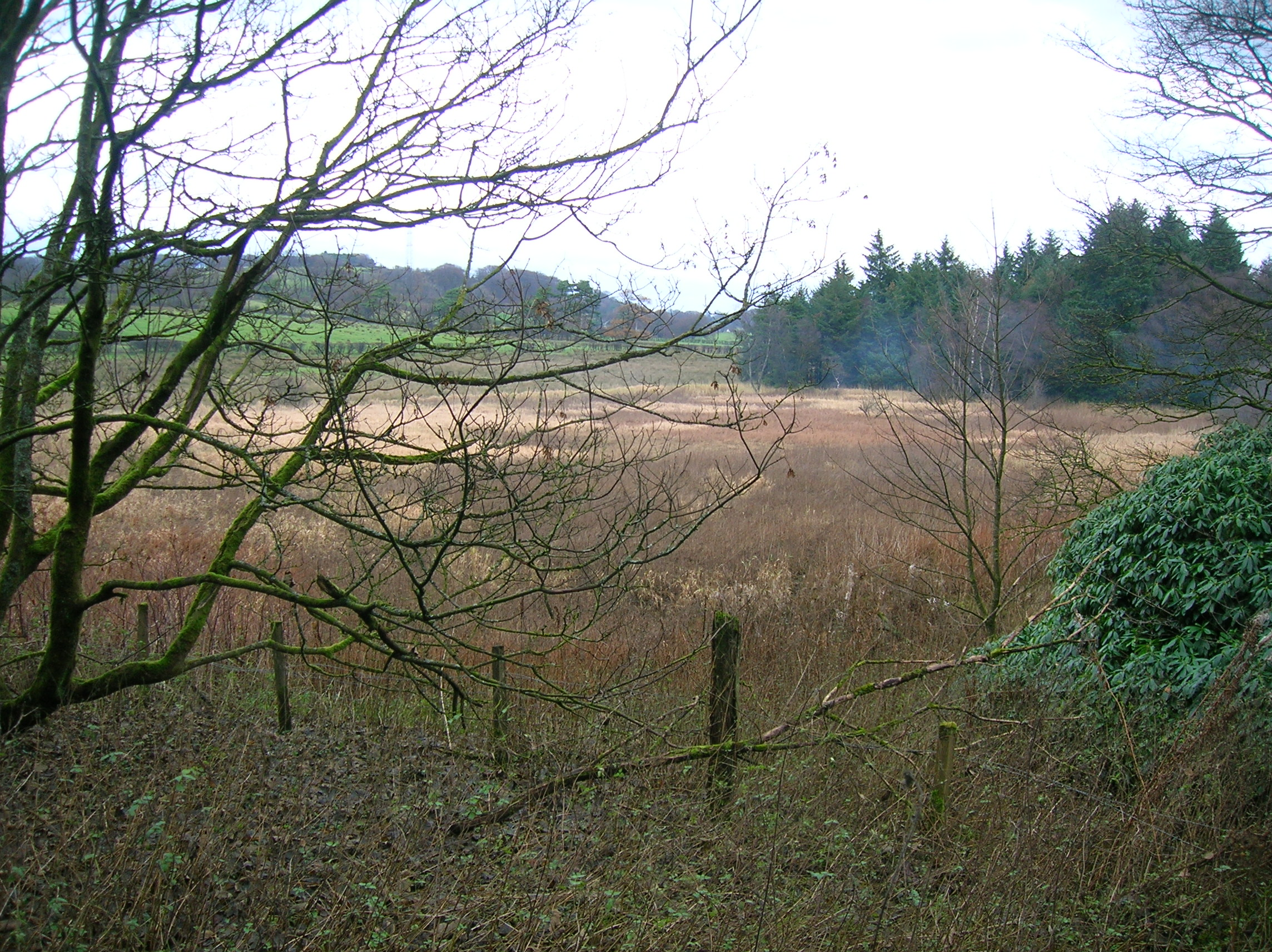
- The site of Hessilhead Loch from the old castle site

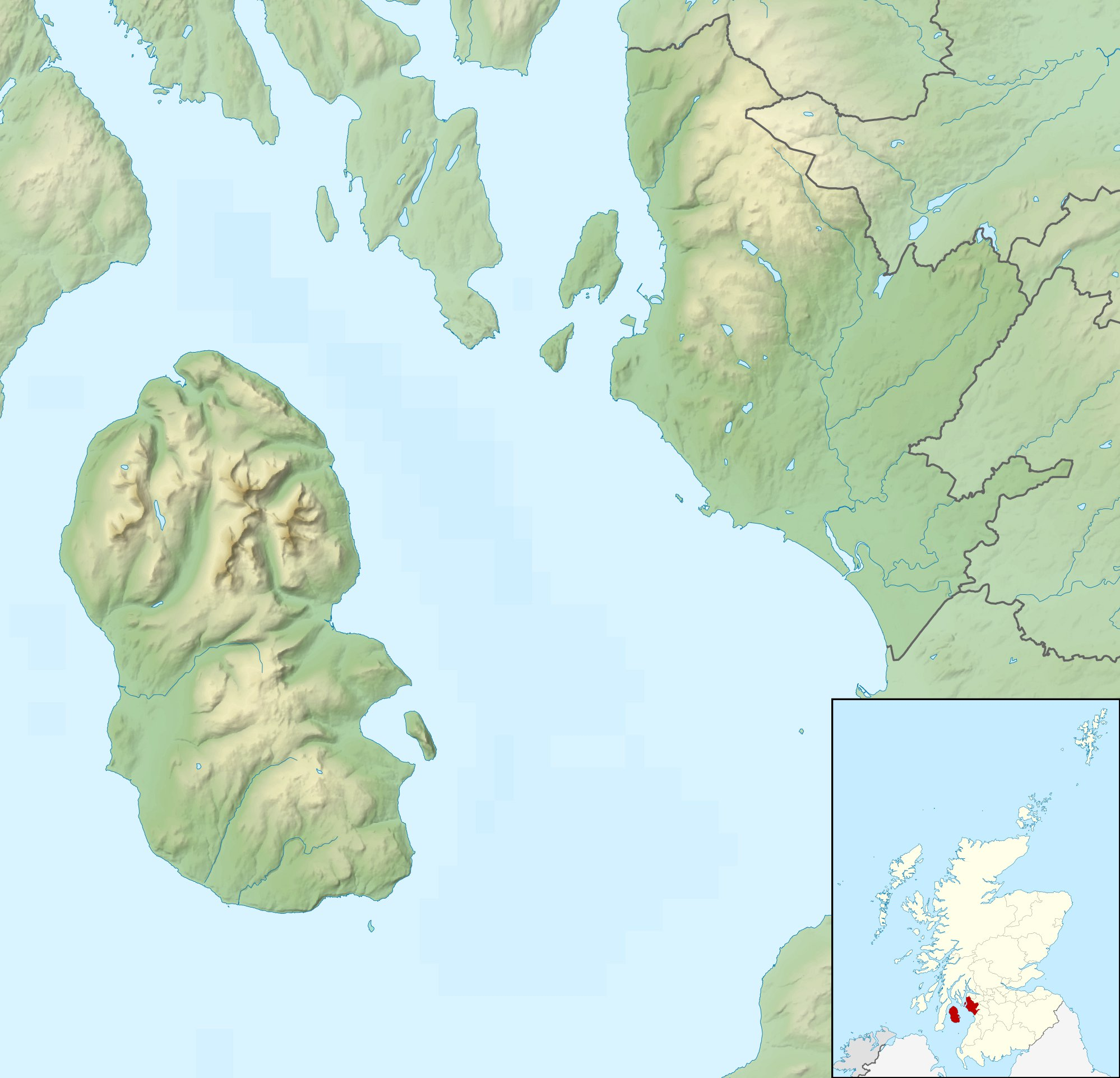
- Location within North Ayrshire
- Location: Hessilhead, North Ayrshire, Scotland
- Type: Drained freshwater loch
- Primary inflows: Rainfall and runoff
- Primary outflows: Dusk Water
- Basin countries: Scotland
- Islands: None
- Settlements: Beith

Hessilhead Loch or Hazelhead Loch was situated in a low-lying area near the old Castle of Hessilhead in the Parish of Beith, North Ayrshire, Scotland. The old loch, used in the defence of the castle, was probably infilled when the castle ruins were landscaped in the 19th century.

== History ==
=== Defensive use ===
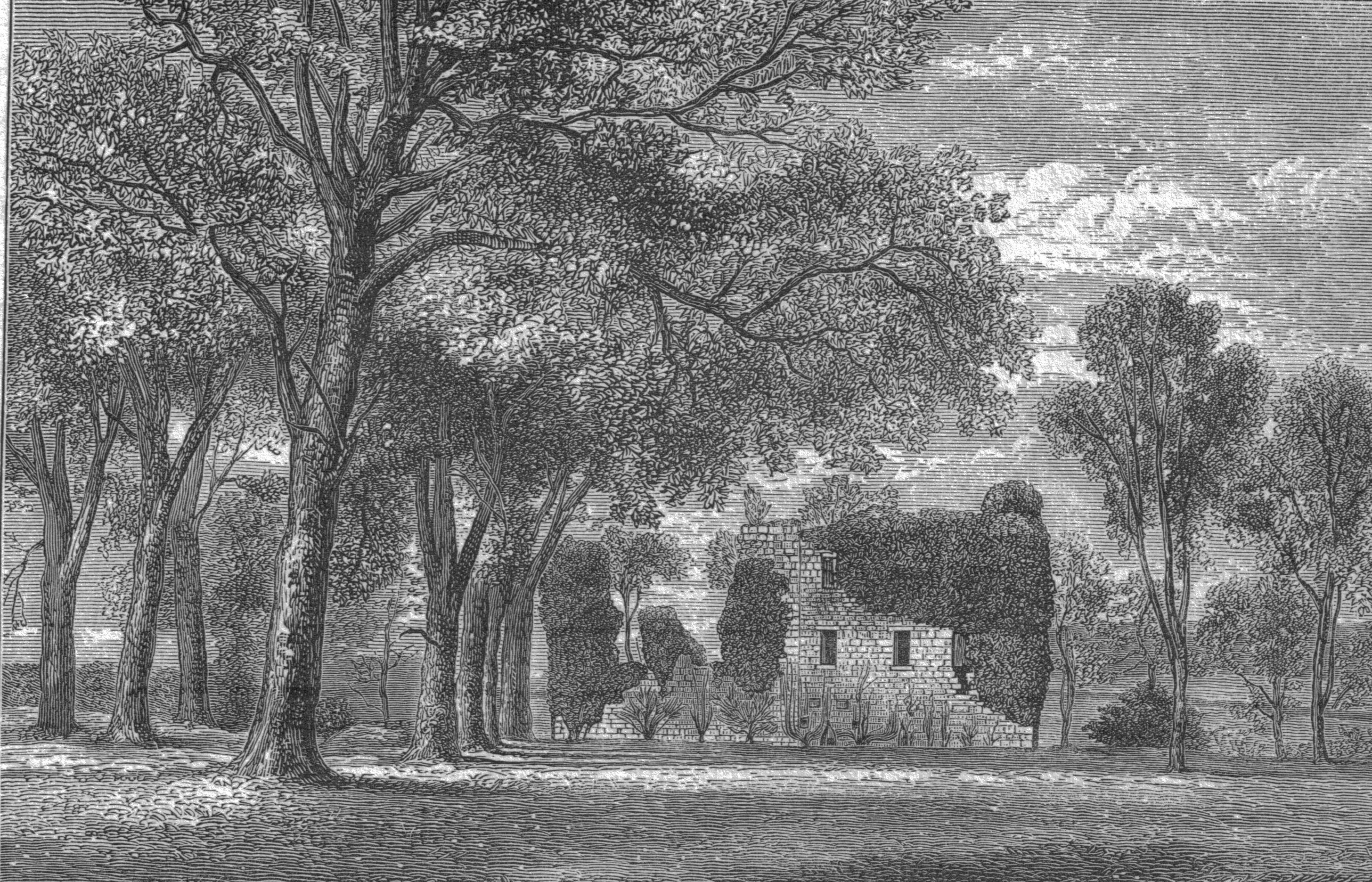
The castle ruins in the 19th century.

In 1956 the Royal Commission recorded that Hessilhead Castle has been demolished. Extensive quarrying around the site has removed any possible traces of a moat. No building vestiges remain. The drainage from the quarry does use what was once a moat Timothy Pont in around 1604 records that the castle was protected by substantial ditches and stood on a loch. This loch has long since been drained and the ditches filled in. Dobie sees the loch and ditches as the only defensive features of the site.

The Kilmarnock Standard in 1949 wrote an article Ancient Ayrshire Castles in which it was stated that the castle stood in the middle of a loch with ditches, presumably meaning a moat.

=== Drainage ===
The loch's drainage may have begun in the early 18th century when Alexander Montgomerie, 10th Earl of Eglinton, was pursuing a number of agricultural improvements on his extensive estates and other landowners followed his example. Further drainage work may have taken place in the 1740s as part of the improvements undertaken to provide employment for Montgomerie Irish estate workers during the Irish potato famines of the 1740s and the mid 19th centuries.

=== Curling Pond ===
The OS map of 1911-12 shows that a curling pond was excavated on part of the old loch site. This pond was abandoned by 1958 as it is no longer shown.

=== Cartographic evidence ===
Blaeu's map of 1654, dating from Timothy Pont's survey of circa 1604, clearly shows the loch and indicates that it and the outflow nearly surrounded the castle site. Roy's map of 1747 shows the loch present, situated on the edge of an inflow burn. Armstrong's map of 1775 and Thomson's map of 1832 do not record a loch.

The 19th century Ordnance Survey maps show the site as an area free of trees and later (1911–12) as the site of a curling pond. In 2011 the drainage here remains inadequate and the area is dominated by marsh plants.

Previous location of Hessilhead Loch, North Ayrshire
