= Meikle Millbank Mill =

Coordinates: 55.781335°N 4.6485414°W

Millbank Mill: Scots: Meikle Millbank Mill
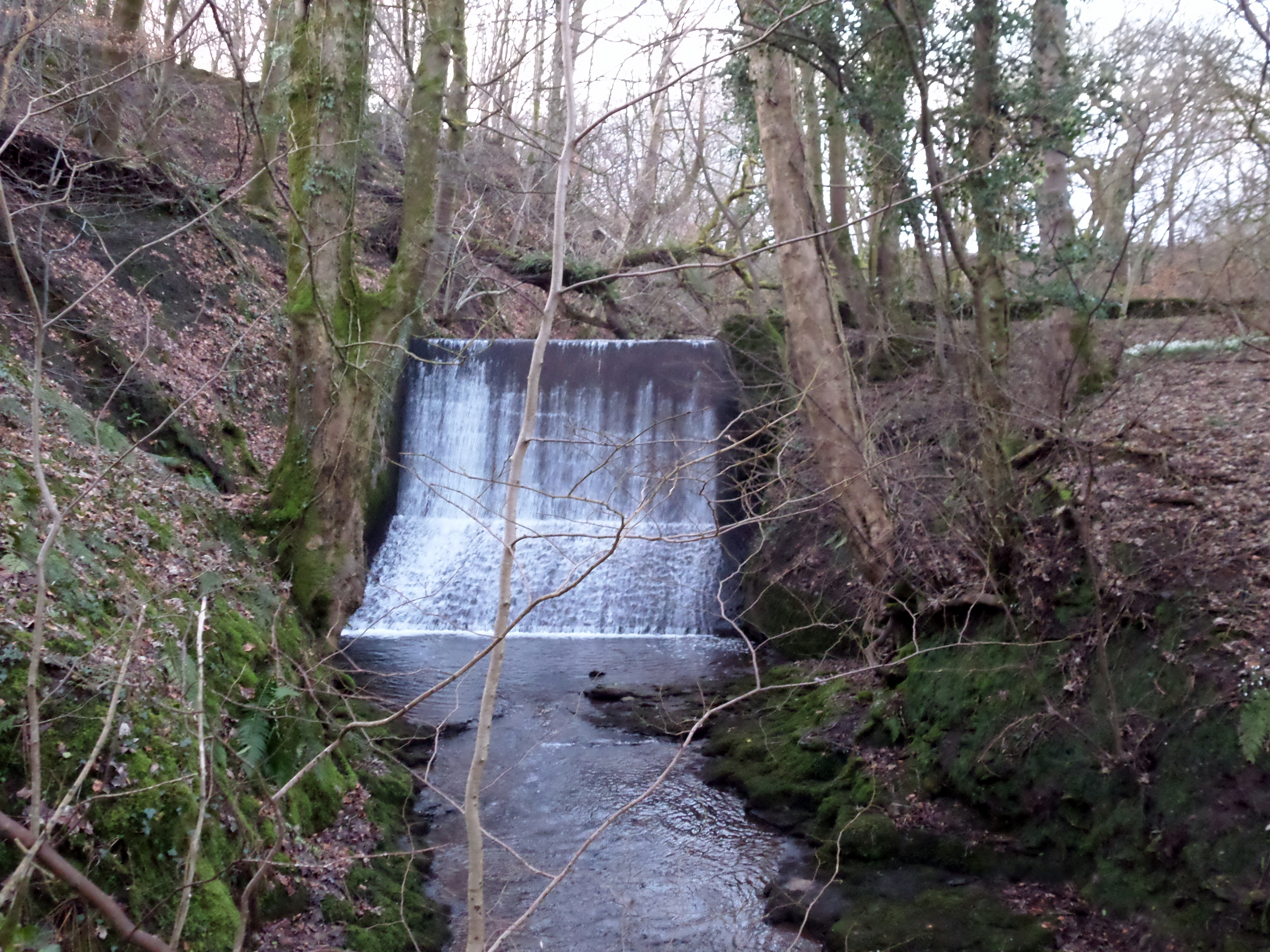
- The Millbank Mill dam

- Location within Renfrewshire
- OS grid reference: NS340574
- Council area: Renfrewshire
- Country: Scotland
- Sovereign state: United Kingdom
- Police: Scotland
- Fire: Scottish
- Ambulance: Scottish
- UK Parliament: Paisley and Renfrewshire South
- Scottish Parliament: Renfrewshire South

Millbank Mill or Meikle Millbank Mill was an old corn mill in Burnbank Glen overlooking the Barr Loch near Lochwinnoch in Renfrewshire, south-west Scotland. The present ruins date from at least the end of the 18th century with structural evidence for six phases of development that finally ceased when the mill closed circa 1950. The mill was a two-storey building, developed to become T-shaped complex when at a later stage a grain kiln was added.

== History ==
Milbanck (sic) is recorded on Blaeu's maps of 1654 and 1662–1665 although a mill is only suggested by the name itself. In 1796 the mill is depicted on a map by John Ainslie with the mill dam and mill pond located far up the glen at a 'T' junction of the lane that once ran to Auchenhane (sic) rather than the later location near the mill itself. The mill at that time is shown with two buildings above. The miller's dwelling may have doubled as a small farm as most millers had a second occupation in between the busy post-harvest times when the majority of milling took place. At Millmannoch near Coylton the miller also worked as a blacksmith when milling was not required. A Robert Or of Mylbank (sic) is mentioned in a 'Warrant for a Respite' in 1526 and another Robert Orr is recorded in the Poll Tax Register at Myllnebanck (sic) in 1695 with his wife Tean Breadine, daughters Isobel, Margaret and Jean with servants William Allan and Isobel Riddell. A James Ritchie is recorded at Little Myllnebanck is recorded in 1695.

=== Thirlage ===
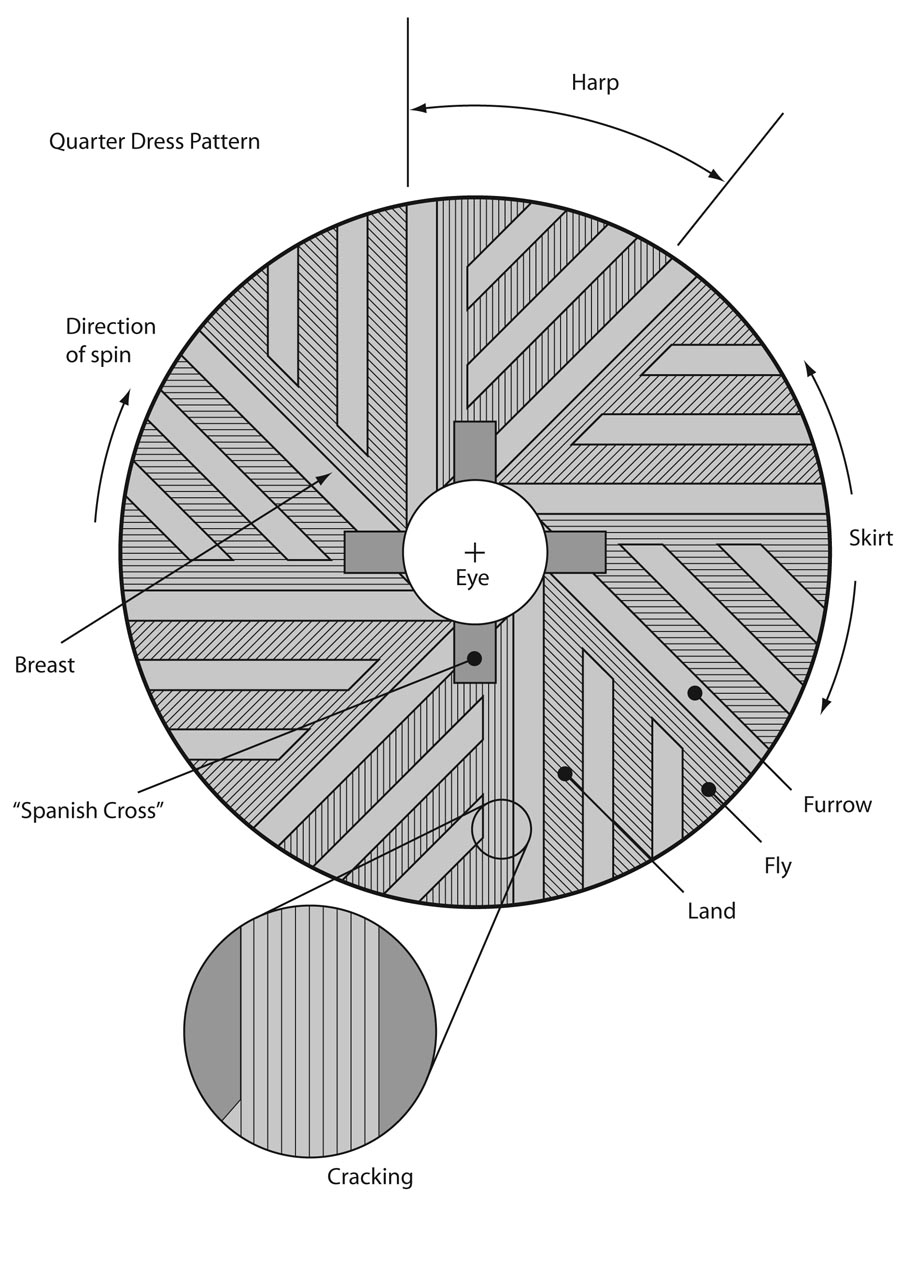
The basic anatomy of a millstone. This is a runner stone and it is not of a composite construction. The bedstone would not have the "Spanish Cross" into which the supporting mill rind would fit and deliver the turning power from the waterwheel gearing.

Thirlage was the feudal law by which the laird (lord) could require all those farmers living on his lands to bring their grain to his mill to be ground. Additionally, they had to carry out repairs on the mill, maintain the lade and weir as well as conveying new millstones to the site. The width of some of the first roads was determined by the requirements of at least two people on either side of a grindstone with a wooden axle called a 'mill-wand'.

The Thirlage Law was repealed in 1779 and after this many mills fell out of use as competition and unsubsidised running costs took their toll. This may explain why so many mills went out of use whilst mills such as Millbank thrived due to their location and natural resources.

== Millbank Mill ==
The corn mill was originally powered by the waters of the Millbank Burn that were originally stored behind a dam then located at the top of the glen, however sometime later a concrete dam was built closer to the mill and a sluice controlled the flow via a lade or mill race to the overshot waterwheel situated within the building. It is unclear as to how the water was delivered to the wheel previous to the concrete dam being built (prior to 1857), as a direct powering from the burn seems unlikely given the location. The dam remains in good condition and looks to be of no great age. A spillway or overflow was located between the sluice and the wooden section of the lade, the elevated head race that directed the water onto the top of the waterwheel inside the mill building.

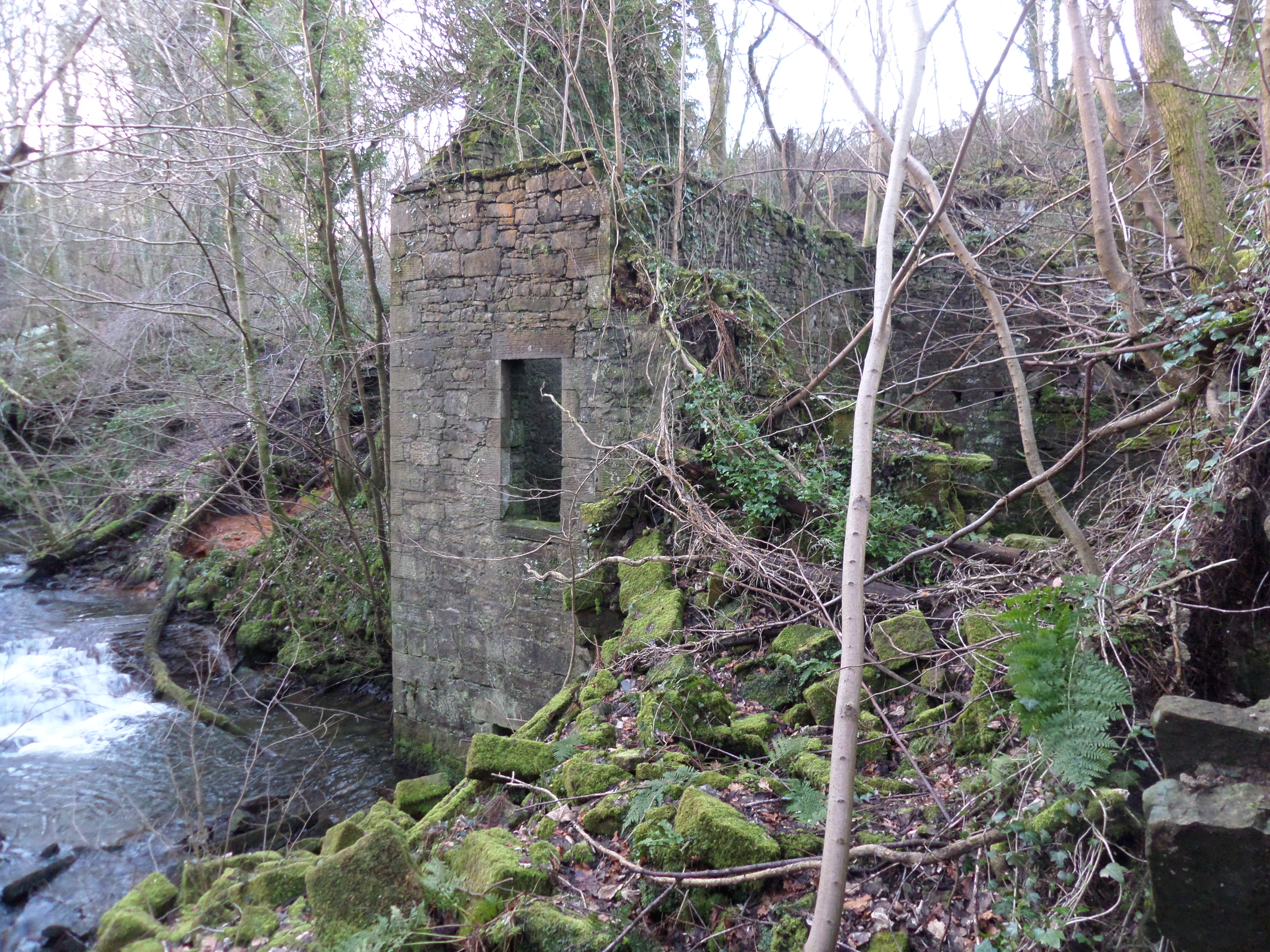
The section of the mill that housed the waterwheel.

The mill had two sets of millstones that were composite, bound together with metal bands and possibly formed of Paris or French burrstone that was used for finer grinding and composed of sections that were cemented together with plaster. Well known millstone quarries were located at Kaim Hill near Fairlie in North Ayrshire. One millstone removed the husk from the grain and the other ground the corn down to meal.

The waterwheel was 1m by 6m and had eight wooden spokes and wooden buckets. It had an iron axle and iron rings, the wheel pit and the wheel being enclosed within the two storey high stone walls of the main mill building.

In 1910 the OS map shows that a lean to extension had been added to the gable end of the main mill building. By 1910 the Lochwinnoch 'Loop Line' had been built and it cut across the lane to East Lochhead with the railway crossing by an overbridge.

A limestone quarry was located on the western side of the Millbank Burn accessible from the lane near Millbank Bridge and with a track leading into the nearby field.

A short lade-like water channel still stands to the east of the Millbank Bridge running as a wall for a short distance parallel to the lane above. It was not present in 1857 and may have supplied water to the machinery of some sort, such as a water pump. This lade is shown on the 1895 OS map and on the 1910 map. It ends abruptly without re-joining the burn.

Meikle Millbank Farm was the location of the miller's house and a dwelling has been recorded near Millbank Glen since at least the 17th century.

== Transport ==
A lane ran from East Lochhead Farm to the mill over a well-built stone bridge and then joined the lane that runs to what is now Meikle Millbank Farm. A network of country lanes ran to nearby Lochwinnoch via the Leffox Bridge and to Kilbirnie via the Kerse and Hole farms.

== Micro-history ==
17th century water mill
The sounds of the mechanism grinding flour.

In 1828 the 'Paisley Magazine' recorded that the minor poet Alexander Wilson, who lived at Auchenbathie Tower, wrote a poem "Rabbie's Mistak" concerning the hunting exploits of Robin Stirrat from Lochhead, the setting being Millbank Glen.

In 1814 a scheme was carried out to drain the Barr Loch however the water level at the lowest point of the loch was too low to drain away naturally into the canal so a water-driven pump was installed at Hole of Barr to raise the water from the loch bed into the canal. Later this was converted to steam power and a tall chimney built. The ‘Barr Meadows’ was around 170 acres and were used for growing oats or for rough grazing until in 1946 a lack of maintenance of the sluices led to the loch bed flooding once more.

== See also ==
- Barburgh Mill, Closeburn
- Dalgarven Mill, Kilwinning
- Enterkinfoot Mill
- Nether Mill
- Millmannoch, Coylton
- Coldstream Mill

== Bibliography ==
- Ferguson, Robert (2005). A Miller's Tale. The Life and Times of Dalgarven Mill. ISBN 0-9550935-0-3
- Gauldie, Enid (1981). The Scottish Miller 1700 - 1900. Pub. John Donald. ISBN 0-85976-067-7
- Home, John (1976). The Industrial Archaeology of Scotland. I. The Lowlands and Borders. B. T. Batsford Ltd. ISBN 0713432349
