= Nether Mill =

Coordinates: 55.7484°N 4.6804°W

Nether Mill: Scots: Nether Mill
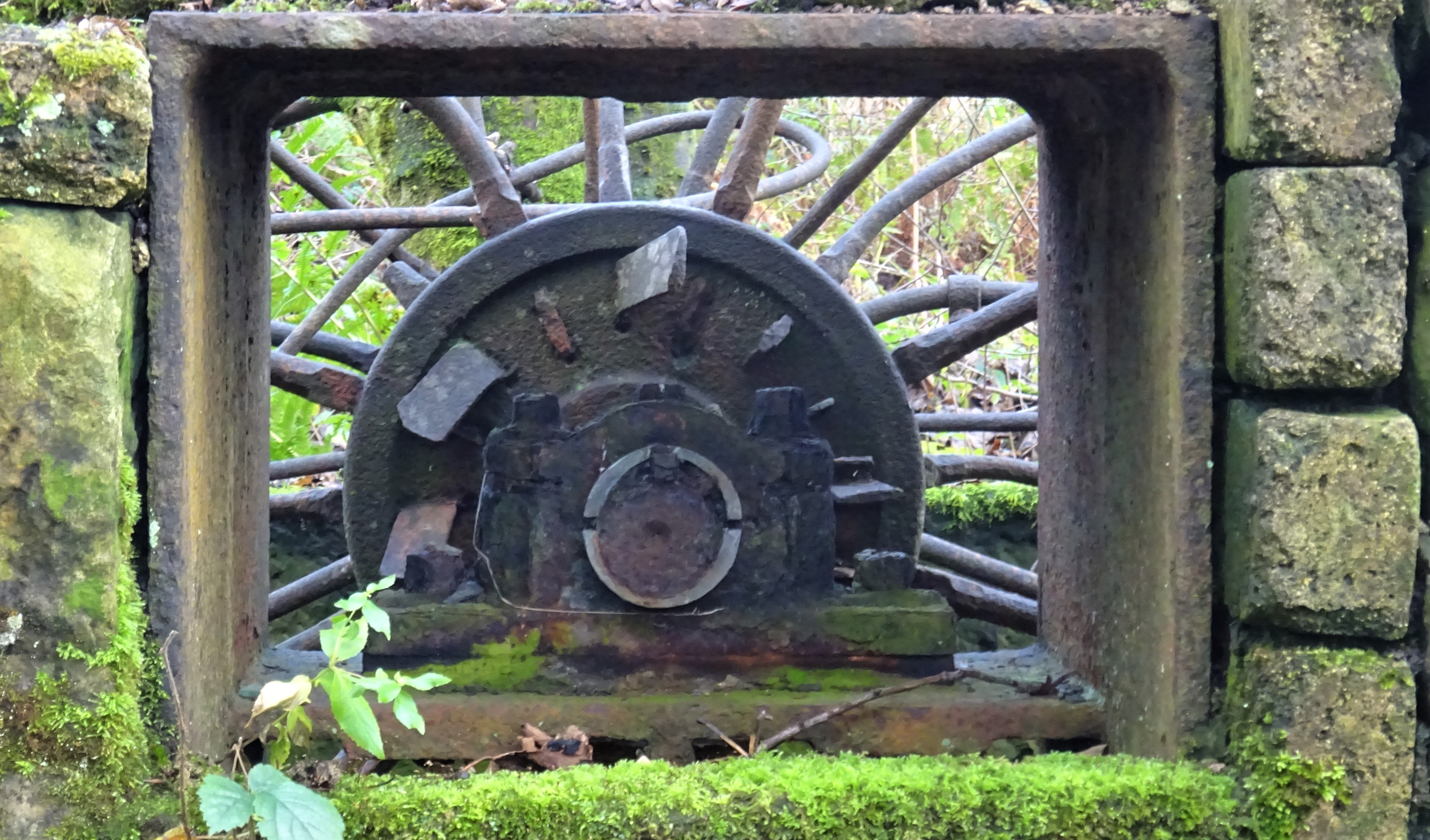
- The Nether Mill waterwheel

- Location within North Ayrshire
- OS grid reference: NS318538
- Council area: North Ayrshire
- Lieutenancy area: Ayrshire and Arran
- Country: Scotland
- Sovereign state: United Kingdom
- Police: Scotland
- Fire: Scottish
- Ambulance: Scottish
- UK Parliament: North Ayrshire and Arran
- Scottish Parliament: Cunninghame North

Nether Mill or the Nethermiln of Kilbirnie was originally the Barony of Kilbirnie corn mill and later became a meal mill as well, located in the Parish of Kilbirnie, near Kilbirnie Loch, North Ayrshire, south-west Scotland. The present ruins date from at least the start of the 20th century with structural evidence for at least three phases of development that finally ceased when the mill closed and abandoned c. 1938. The mill was probably a single storey building, developed to become a complex when at a later stage buildings such as a grain kiln, cottage and a wheel house enclosure may have been added. The mound near the site is locally known as the 'Miller's Knowe'. Kilbirnie Ladeside F.C. is named for the lade of the mill that has its confluence with the Garnock opposite the club's grounds.

== History ==
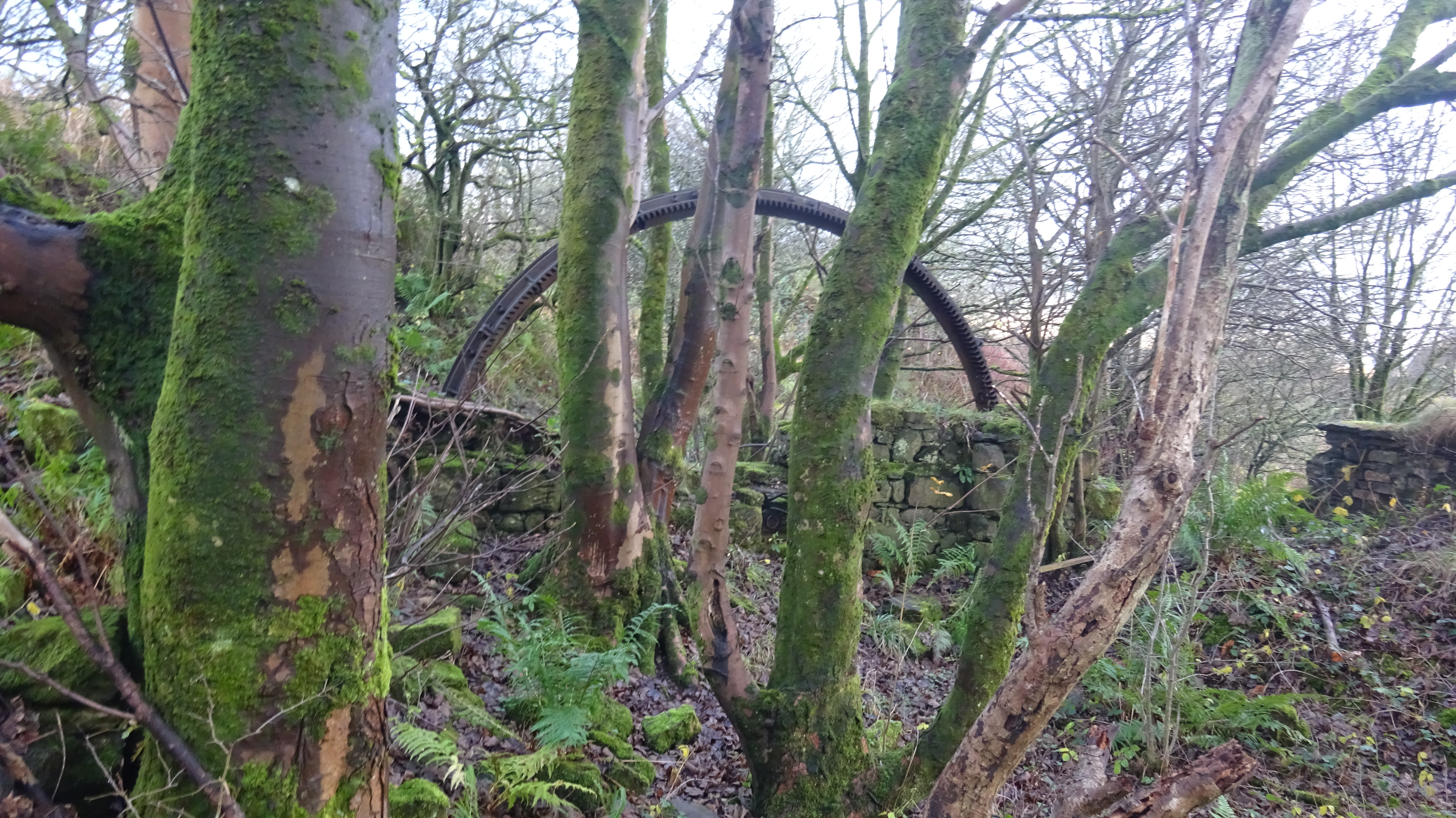
Waterwheel remnants

A 'Neth Mill' is first recorded on the 1750s William Roy military map as well as a 'Load Side' or 'Lade Side' dwelling where the mill lade runs up towards its confluence with the Garnock. Robert Aitken's survey of 1827 shows Nethermill and records that only one corn mill and one lint or flax mill were present in the parish. The New Statistical Account of 1845 states that the mill was the barony mill and was known as the Nethermiln of Kilbirnie. The mill is recorded as the only corn mill in the parish in the 1845 Statistical Account. In Scotland the main cereal crop was oats and the word 'Corn' is synonymous.

The Scots name 'Nether', meaning 'lower' may refer to the presence of Stonyholm Mill, a flax mill, that stands upstream on the River Garnock. The lade that supplied Nether Mill via its rectangular mill pond ran down from the Stonyholm site with a levelling pond en route. The miller's dwelling originally doubled as a small farm with a garden, stabling and a few acres of land. Most millers had a second occupation in between the busy post-harvest times when the majority of milling took place. At Millmannoch near Coylton for instance the miller also worked as a blacksmith when milling was not required. Nether Mill was the property of the Earl of Glasgow in the 1850s with a George Dickie as the tenant, possibly the son of the previous miller.

In 1792 Mr Dickie, the miller, was building the road near the mill pond when he uncovered an empty stone coffin, 6.5 feet long by 2.5 feet wide. He is recorded to have broken up this coffin or kist and used it in the road's construction. Three others had been found closer to Kilbirnie Bridge, one of which contained a funerary urn filled with burnt bones, but none with a tumulus or mound over them.

George Dickie, corn miller at Nether Mill, died on May 6, 1859, of old age and is buried at Kilbirnie Kirk. His father, Alastair Dickie, was also a corn miller and was married to Margaret Craufurd.

=== Thirlage ===
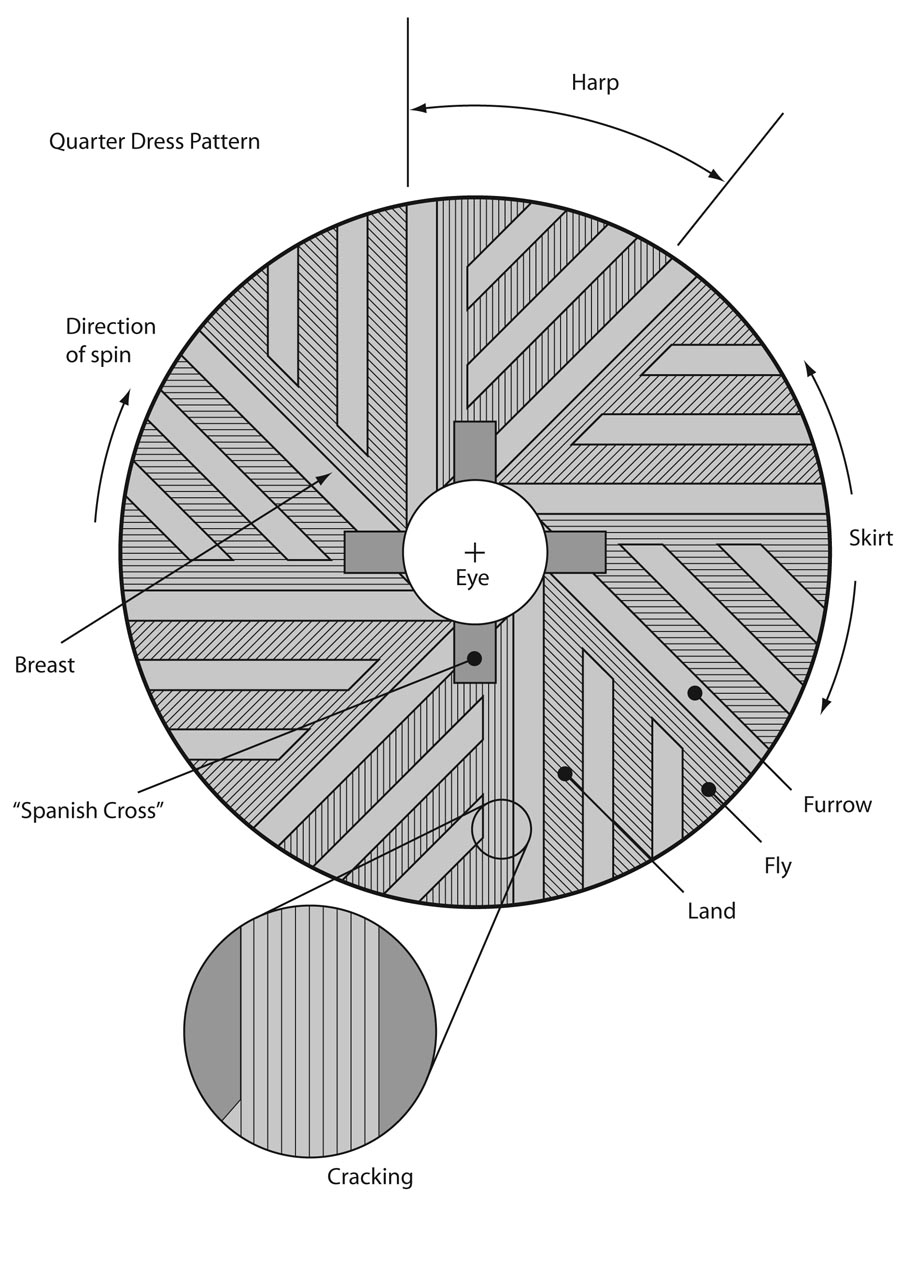
The basic anatomy of a millstone. This is a runner stone and it is not of a composite construction. The bedstone would not have the "Spanish Cross" into which the supporting mill rind would fit and deliver the turning power from the waterwheel gearing.

Thirlage was the feudal law by which the laird could require all those farmers living on his lands to bring their grain to his barony mill to be ground. Additionally, they had to carry out repairs on the mill, maintain the lade and weir as well as conveying new millstones to the site. The width of some of the first roads was determined by the requirements of at least two people on either side of a millstone with a wooden axle called a 'mill-wand'.

The Thirlage Law was repealed in 1779 and after this many mills fell out of use as competition and unsubsidised running costs took their toll. This may explain why so many mills went out of use whilst mills such as Nether Mill thrived, expanding due to their convenient location for customers and the natural resource of an abundant and reliable water supply.

As the Barony Mill or miln, the Kilbirnie farmers were thirled to Nether Mill and in 1845 paid a multure of forty-first peck, whilst oats brought in from outside the parish were exacted a fifteenth to twentieth of each peck ground. A peck was a dry measure for oats, wheat, meal, pease and salt, etc. The measure varied and as an example the Linlithgow standard wheat peck was 1.996 Imperial Gallons. It ceased to have legal status as a measure after 1824.

== Nether Mill ==
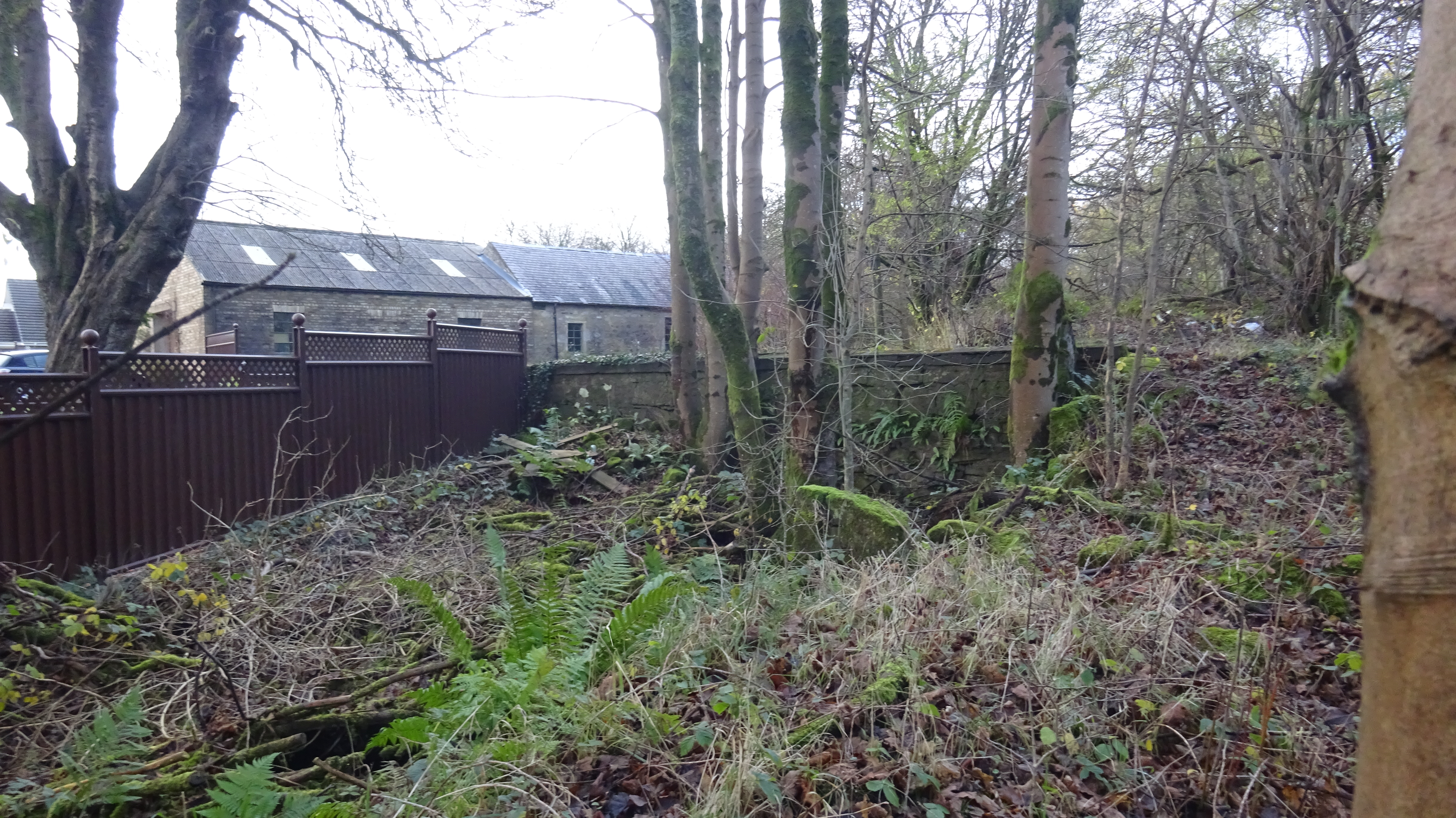
Mill buildings remnants.

This old corn and meal mill, was once powered by the waters of the River Garnock that were stored in a roughly rectangular mill pond behind a substantial dam located above the mill, reaching the mill wheel in 1855 by a short mill race. A small unroofed building stood at top the south-east of the mill pond in the 1850s. It appears from the OS map that the wheel may have been later covered by a wheel house by 1909. The present surviving metal water wheel dates from the mid-19th century. The ruins of a rectangular rubble building survive, with some evidence of another building that stood at right angles to it. The main difference between corn and meal milling is that meal is a coarse-ground edible part of various grains mainly used as an animal feed whilst corn milling produces a fine flour for baking purposes.

The framework of the suspended iron mid-breast water wheel survives, 3ft wide by 18ft diameter (0.91m by 5.49m). The buckets and sole may have been of sheet iron and the unusual internal drive to the mill was via an internal cast iron gear ring on the wheel itself. Breastshot water wheels have the water hitting the wheel roughly centrally, usually between one quarter and three quarters of the height. The buckets have to be carefully shaped to ensure that the water enters smoothly. A large volume of water is required with a moderate head and the efficiency is between fifty and sixty per cent.

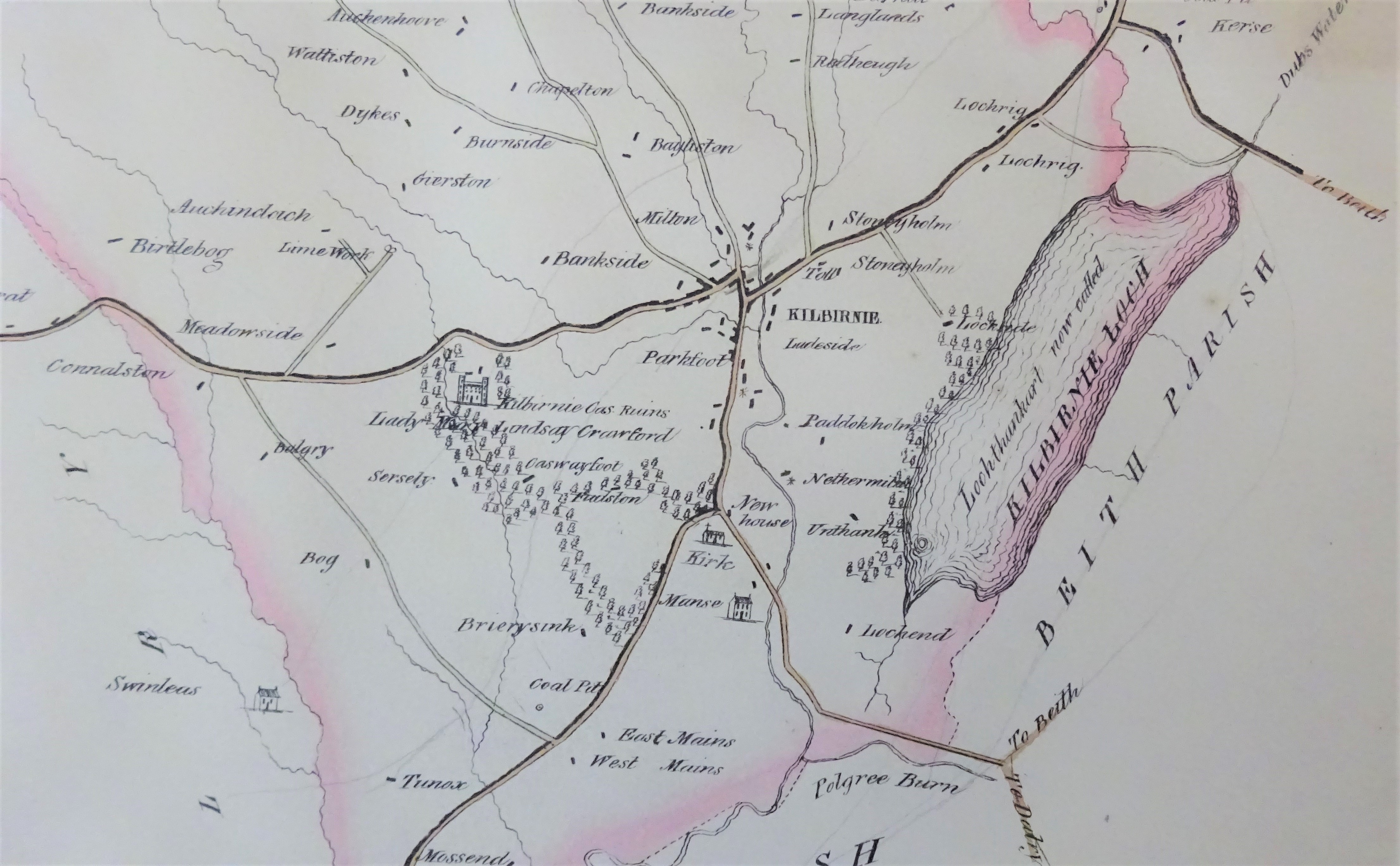
1827 survey map of Kilbirnie showing Nethermill

In a 1976 photograph the wheel was intact minus the buckets and sole, however one side of the cast iron mill wheel has been broken since that time. The wheel pit with its well built splash wall of high quality dressed stone survives and the water was carried via a tail race to a confluence with the nearby River Garnock. A substantial and partly walled lade was built that ran parallel to the lane for a short distance and this carried the water from the wheel down to Garnock.

The mill is recorded on the 1832 Thomson's map of Kilbirnie. In 1855 a second smaller mill pond lay below the main mill pond. A group of buildings, shown in 1855, stand to the north of the mill associated with a small garden area, that may have once been part of the mill complex. The 1895 OS shows the mill pond with a surface area of 0.363 of an acre with a small spillway running from the mill end through the site of the second pond. In 1895 the larger mill pond was present, but the smaller one had been infilled. The purpose of this smaller pond is unclear although it may have served as a retting pond for preparing flax, if, like the Stonyholm Mill, Nether Mill had retted flax at some point in its working life, possibly for Stonyholm.

The 1909 mill race running from the mill pond to the mill was larger and a building, possibly a cottage, lying to the south of the mill race nearly parallel to the lane had been built close to the earth mound that stands next to the path. By 1895 the Kilbirnie Branch of the Lanarkshire and Ayrshire Railway with its embankment had been built and lay immediately to the east of the mill, closing in 1930. The 1938 OS map shows the mill pond drained and the mill disused. After closure the remaining walls of the mill next to the lane were capped with stone flags.

=== The Miller's Knowe ===
The earth mound known as the 'Miller's Knowe' has been identified as an 'ancient sepulchral tumuli', a burial mound, in the 1845 New Statistical Account of Ayrshire. In Scotland, barrows or cairns of many types were in common use for burials from the late Neolithic until the end of the Bronze Age. The mound in 1845 was 18 yards in length, 9 yards wide and 6 yards in height. Local belief regarded it as a tumulus, however it may have been formed by excavation between it and the adjoining bank to provide material for the dam, creating the second mill pond.

The existing knowe lies to the south of the mill near the old junction in the lane for Unthank Cottage and the old lime kiln. The location of the stone coffin or kist was close to the mill wheel, near the base of the mound.

=== Mill remnants ===
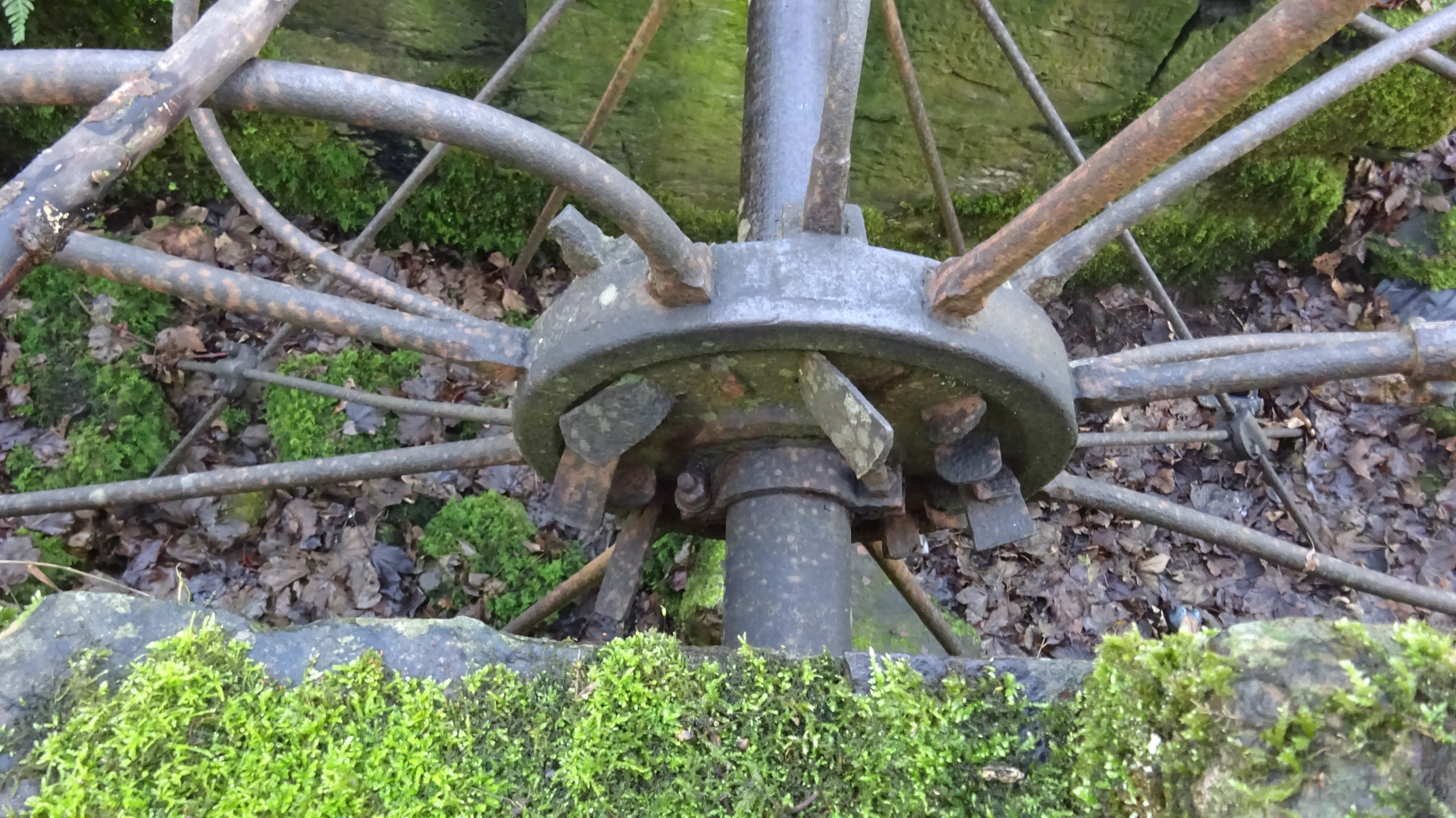
The axle and supports of the waterwheel

In 2022 the inner ring of the cast iron waterwheel was intact and still linked with the drive wheel that ran into the mill interior. The outer ring of the waterwheel was broken into several pieces and the supporting metal rods were buckled. After heavy rain water still ran through the course of the old spillway and lade and tail race, which remains intact to its confluence with the Garnock opposite the Kilbirnie Ladeside FC's grounds. The mill wall facing the lane was largely intact and indications of entrance door jambs survived on the north facing wall remnant and another next to the wheel. Signs of the old buildings east wing were discernable at ground level. The axle of the waterwheel within its cast iron box in the splash wall was in good condition. No millstones or any other mill machinery were visible inside the old mill. Industrial style buildings still stand to the north that may have been part of the mill complex. The mound known locally as the Miller's Knowe still stands beyond the site of the possible cottage or grain kiln (datum 2022).

=== Excavation ===
In 2007 a programme of archaeological evaluation and survey works was undertaken and the trenches had a common stratigraphic sequence with topsoil overlying variable subsoil. The report concluded that the mill should be considered as of local importance.

== Unthank ==
In 1827 and in the 1850s a small cottage known as Unthank, with a garden & stable was once situated nearby, also the property of the Earl of Glasgow. The name 'Unthank', a common farm name, may mean 'barren soil' as in the Old English 'un-panc'. or land used without consent, a 'Squatters Farm'. 'Loc Tancu' is the earliest recorded name for Kilbirnie Loch dating from c. 1210 and the name 'Loch Tankard', 'Thankard' or 'Thankart' was used locally. The name 'Unthank' or 'Onthank' may therefore instead be derived from 'Tancu'.

An 'Onthank' is recorded on the 1750s William Roy military map. The cottage was a ruin by the time of the 1895 OS Map. A lime kiln was located near to the lane leading down to Unthank Farm. In 1648 a John Gulliland is recorded as living at Unthank.

== Transport ==
The tenant, George Dickie is recorded as having improved access. Knoxville Road runs down from Paddockholm Road which had a ford linking it to Holmhead Road. The lane running south from the mill once linked up with the road system in the Lochend and Glengarnock area.

17th century water mill
The sounds of the mechanism grinding flour.

== Historical timeline ==
17th century - the Nethermiln of Kilbirnie was the barony mill for the Barony of Kilbirnie.

1750s - Neth Mill is recorded on William Roy's military map.

1779 - Thirlage law repealed. Farmers were free to use the mill of their choice. Nether Mill was however the only corn mill in the parish.

1792 - the miller, probably Alastair Dickie, was building the road near the mill pond when he uncovered an empty ancient stone coffin or kist. Alastair's wife was Margaret Craufurd.

1827 - Robert Aitken's survey records Nethermill and that only one corn mill and one lint or flax mill existed in the parish.

1832 - the mill is recorded on John Thomson's map of Kilbirnie.

1845 - the New Statistical Account of 1845 records that the corn mill was the only one in the parish.

1845 - the earth mound known as the 'Miller's Knowe' was identified as an 'ancient sepulchral tumuli', a burial mound, in the 1845 New Statistical Account of Ayrshire.

1850s - Nether Mill was the property of the Earl of Glasgow and the miller was George Dickie.

1859 - George Dickie, the corn miller, died and was buried at Kilbirnie Kirk.

1909 - the mill had been extended, the mill race was larger and a building, possibly a cottage or grain kiln built.

1938 - the OS map shows the mill pond drained and the mill disused.

2007 - the site was recorded as being of local importance.

== See also ==
- Barburgh Mill, Closeburn
- Dalgarven Mill, Kilwinning
- Enterkinfoot Mill
- Millmannoch, Coylton
- Coldstream Mill

== Bibliography ==
- Douglas, William Scott (1874). In Ayrshire. Kilmarnock : McKie & Drennan.
- Ferguson, Robert (2005). A Miller's Tale. The Life and Times of Dalgarven Mill. ISBN 0-9550935-0-3
- Gauldie, Enid (1981). The Scottish Miller 1700 - 1900. Pub. John Donald. ISBN 0-85976-067-7
- Home, John (1976). The Industrial Archaeology of Scotland. I. The Lowlands and Borders. B. T. Batsford Ltd. ISBN 0713432349
