= Barburgh Mill =

Coordinates: 55.176892°N 3.7269615°W

- Location within Dumfries and Galloway
- OS grid reference: NX 90116 88316
- Council area: Dumfries and Galloway
- Country: Scotland
- Sovereign state: United Kingdom
- Police: Scotland
- Fire: Scottish
- Ambulance: Scottish
- UK Parliament: Dumfries and Galloway

Barburgh Mill is a hamlet composed of an old lint mill, later extended as a woolen mill and associated buildings, which lies north of Auldgirth on the A76 on the route to Closeburn, in Dumfriesshire, Closeburn Parish, in Dumfries and Galloway, south-west Scotland. Its original nucleus was the old mill with associated buildings, the smithy, toll house and the miller's and workers' dwellings. The site features the A76 that runs nearby, the River Nith and the Lake Burn that once powered the mill via a lade before joining the Nith. The area is famous for its association with the Covenanters. A Roman fortlet stood opposite the mill and a Roman road is thought to have run through Nithsdale at this point.

== History ==
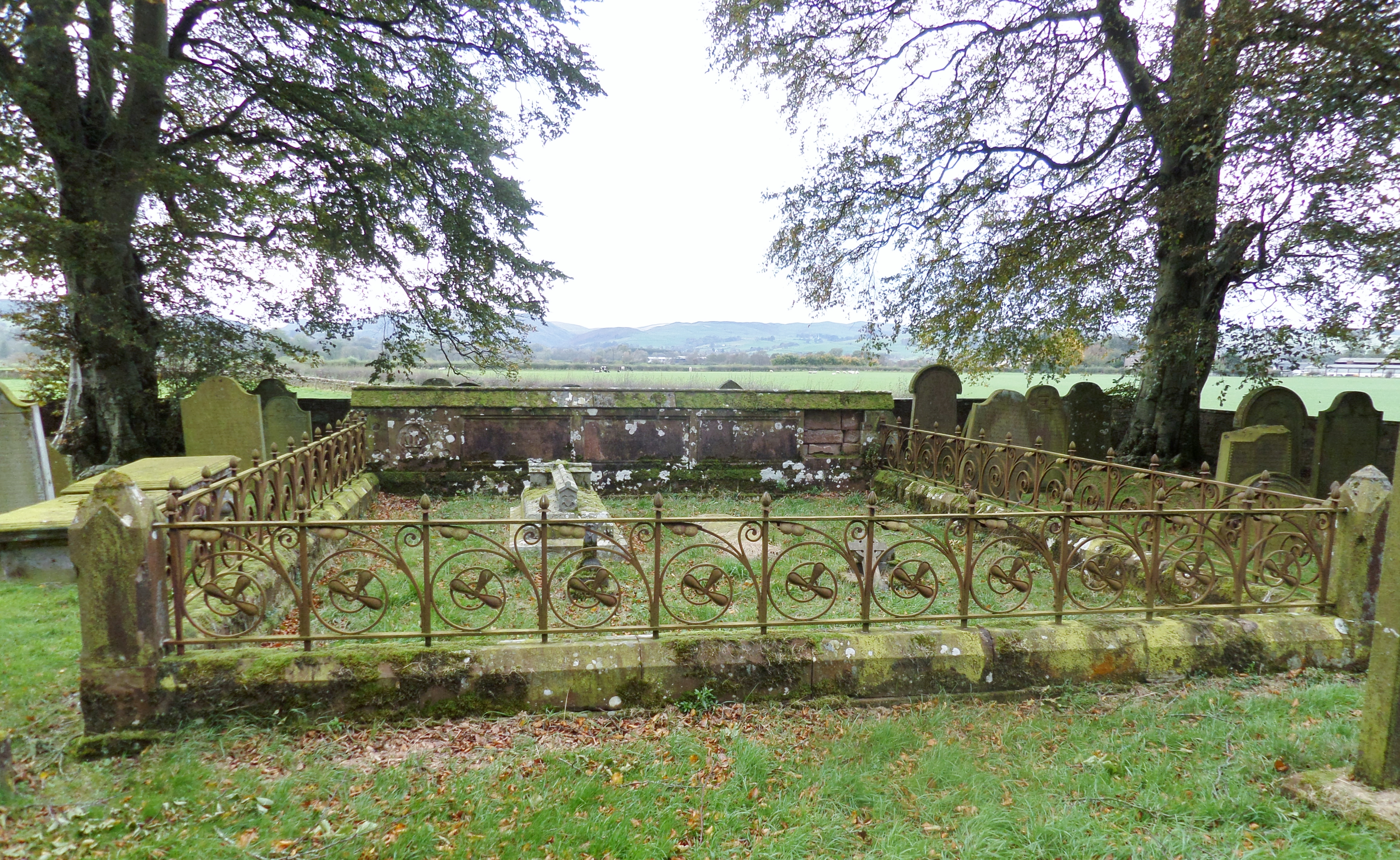
Burial site of Charles Stuart Menteth of Closeburn at Dalgarnock.

The hamlet stands about 4 km south of Closeburn and is now consistently known as 'Barburgh' and the stream is recorded as the Lake Burn, with its source partly from the site of the old Closeburn Loch. The hamlet has had many names recorded, including Barbauch, Burborough, Burnburgh, Burburgh, Burbrught, Barbaroch, Barbarock, Burbrough, Bird-brugh, Barbouy and Barbuy. Previously to 1606 and for a period up until 1697 the hamlet lay in the parish of Dalgarnock.

The first record of the name on Roy's map of 1747-1755 indistinctly reads as 'Bolybruchhead' but no mill or settlement is marked and what is now Whitespots Hill may be intended.

Lake Burn runs down from the site of the now drained Closeburn Loch near Closeburn Castle and has its confluence here with the River Nith at the Lintmill Pool. The area is famous for its association with the Covenanters and the events of the so-called 'Killing Times' that occurred during the reigns of Charles II and James VI and II and eventually led to the establishment of the Presbyterian Church of Scotland.

In the 1848-58 OS Name Book the name is given as 'Burbrough' with several cottages present with gardens and at that time a bobbin mill, making the wooden bobbins vital to spinning and weaving, in what was previously a lint or linen mill. The small Cairns school stood near Cairns Farm, Blackwood and the Railway Cottages in 1899.

In 1901, Watson referred to a 'Bar Brugh' or 'Defence Fort' made of an "..immense mass of stones contiguous to the farm of Cairn, and situated on a narrow plain bounded on one side by the Bar-Hill and on the other side by the River Nith." He states that this circular fort of uncemented stones guarded the entrance to the parish from the south-east however. A S/E confusion with N/W may explain the reference as no such structure or name exists elsewhere in the parish. The railway runs through this site and may have destroyed any fort that existed near Cairn Farm.

== Barburgh Mill, smithy and Burn ==
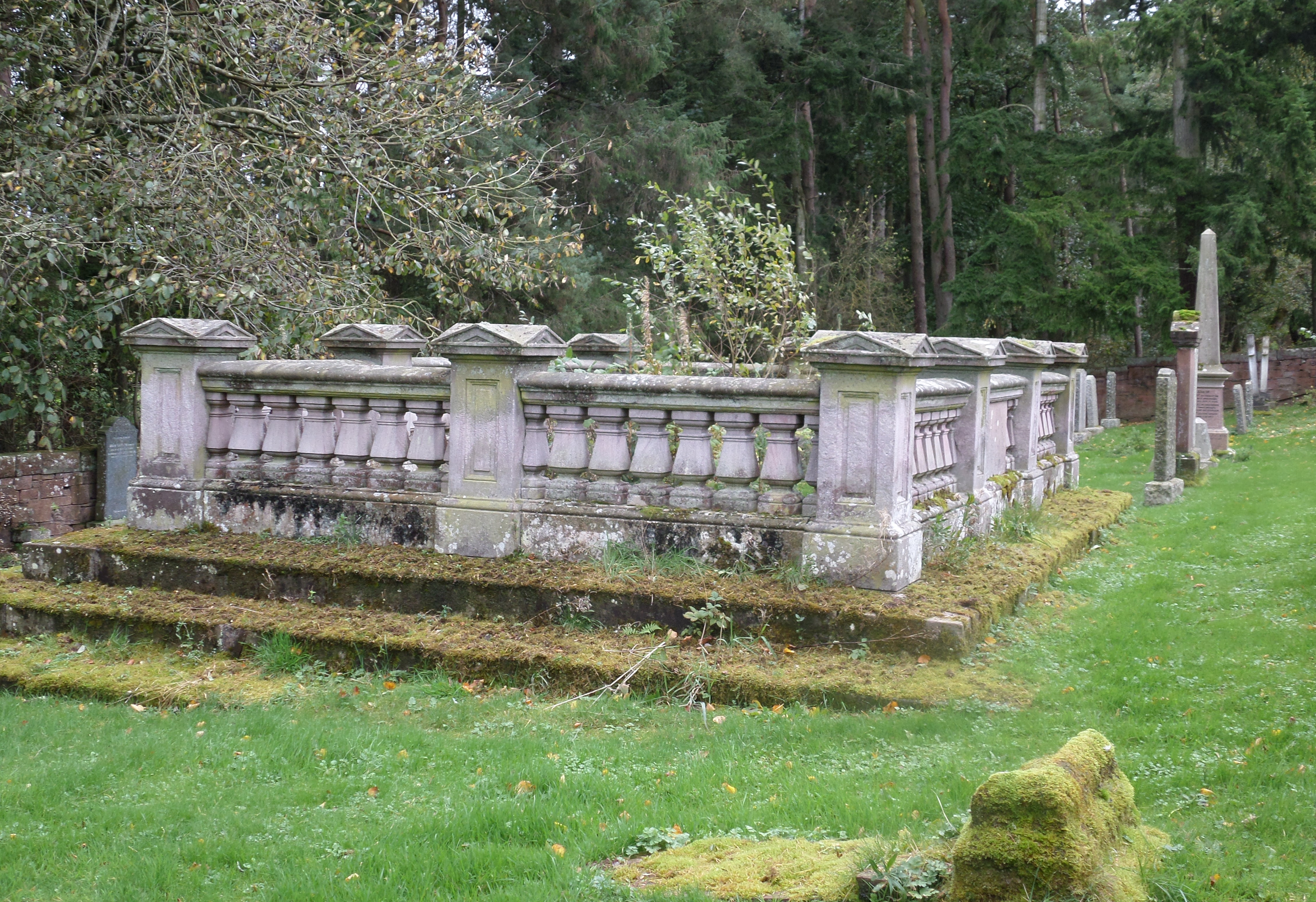
Burial site of the Bairds of Closeburn at Closeburn cemetery.

The mill's water supply was not via the River Nith but was instead from the waters of the Lake Burn via a lade that ran down from Stepends and Whitespots Farms with a system of sluices, overflows and mill ponds. This water supply was part of the Garroch Waterpower Scheme that powered the Park limestone works, Stepends Farm threshing machine, etc. The first record of Barburgh Mill (NX 90116 88316) is that John Padzean, the Covenanter, worked there in 1684, possibly as the miller as Thomas Macmurdy is also noted, but simply as a resident.

On the River Nith near Barbrugh Mill, the OS recorded the place name 'Lintmill Pool', supposedly named from the one time use of the mill for the preparation of lint or linen from Flax (Linum usitatissimum) The mill is first shown on maps in 1804 and is marked as a lint mill, as it was in 1821 and in 1828. The first OS map of 1855 records a 'Bobbin' mill (a spelling error gives 'Bobbing') however by 1899, it is shown as a woolen mill, and it stayed as such until final closure in 1960s.

The present mill may have been built by Charles Stuart Menteth of the Closeburn Estate circa 1790-1810 and by 1862, it was held by the Baird family who had purchased the estate.

In the 1848-58 OS Name Book, the site is recorded as a bobbin mill, making the wooden bobbins vital to spinning and weaving, in what was previously a lint or linen mill.

Upon his death in 1867, James Mackie McKerlie of Barburgh was described as a 'manufacturer' without further specification, confirming that the mill was not a corn or meal mill. Alexander and John Cowan became tenants and in 1900, entries John Elliot is recorded as the tenant.

In the early 19th century the two-story Barburgh Mill, an L-shaped rubble-built structure was used as a woollen mill, manufacturing blankets in 1939 and closed since the 1960s, later partly used as a store. The overshot wheel was enclosed within a wheel house and the mill shows various extensions and alterations, such as the shifting of the course of the lade.

Barburgh Smithy stood to the west of the mill, single-storey and rubble-built with a brick-built extension, no doubt serving local needs in addition to those of the mill. A saw pit was located near by. Stables may have been present here as well as workers accommodation.

Barburgh Mill House stands to the west of the burn and provided accommodation for the miller with a sundial in 1854, usually a high-status feature.

== Barburgh Mill Roman Fortlet ==
In 1945, Barburgh Mill Roman fortlet (NX 9021 8844) was discovered close to the mill and, in 1971, it was fully excavated prior to gravel-quarrying at the location. Quarry operations that destroyed all of the north side of the fortlet and a great deal of its southern side. All surface indications of the fortlet in the surviving area have now gone.

The Roman road ran beneath the fortlet's hillock site. Although turves were found, nothing of the ramparts and an internal surface area of c. 700 sq m or 1/5 acre has been calculated. Two timber barracks of six rooms each were present. During the first Antonine period, such a fortlet would have provided accommodation for one century of infantry. The ditch would still have been discernable until at least the 14th century. An annexe may have been present, but no internal structures were found.

== Transport ==
Barburgh Mill lies in Nithsdale, a natural communication corridor that has resulted in the main A76 road passing through it and the railway cutting through it at a higher level. The Dumfries to Ayr road runs through on its way to Thornhill from Auldgirth. The hamlet never had a passenger station, the nearest today being Sanquhar and previously a station was present at Auldgirth.

As an old turnpike road, the A76 once had a toll-house first recorded as Burbrught Toll in 1821 and also in 1828, however on the 1843-82 OS map, it is called 'Stepends Toll' with a weighing machine and a water trough near by. By 1899 the turnpike system no loner existed, and the site is recorded as 'Whitespots Cottages'.

=== The Killing Times ===
On 5 May 1684, by proclamation, the following people from Closeburn parish were declared to be " Outlaws and Fugitives " : "Given under our signet, at Edinburgh, the fifth May, one thousand six hundred eighty and four years, and of our reign the thirtieth and six year."

John Padzean at the Mill of Bird-brugh (Barbrugh).
Thomas Macmurdy, Barbuy (Barburgh).
James Harkness in Locherbain.
Thomas Milligan at the Mill of Closeburn.
James Gilkerse in Holm of Dalgarnock.
James Hunter, younger in Wood-end.
James Watson, Hill-end.
William Ferguson, Three-rigs.
Robert Dalziel in Cleughfoot, Dalgarnock.

The 'Martyrs Cross' at Dalgarnock Kirk does not record the deaths of the Covenanters John Padzean or Thomas Macmurdy, suggesting that they survived the 'Killing Times'.

John Kirkpatrick lived at Barburgh Head near the mill and had been responsible as an informer for the capture of the Covenanter John Mathison. John had been deported to America however he was able to return and continue his work. John Kirkpatrick had taken petty revenge upon the death of John Mathison by destroying his gravestone in a night time act of vandalism, however his actions had not gone unobserved and after receiving the following letter he was forced to pay for a replacement.

“Mr. [John] Kirkpatrick [in Barburgh head],

We have received information from our friends in Nithsdale how you retaining your old malignity and enmity against the people of God have in pursuance there of adventured to run the risque of meddling with the monument of the dead, demolishing and breaking the gravestone of a sufferer for the cause of Christ which is highly criminal in the eyes of the law, and is more than your neck is worth, and deserves just severity as bringing to remembrance your old hatred, and the hand you had in his sufferings. And now ye seem to be longing for a visit for your old murthering actions, which if you would evite, we straitly charge and command you, upon your perill to repair that stone, by laying one upon the grave, fully as good as the former with the same precise motto as well engraven, and that you perform the work with all expedition, and if it be not done against May day first [1714], which is a sufficient time, we promise to pay you a visit, perhaps to your cost, and if you oblige us which to assure yourself that your old deeds will be remembered to purpose which to assure you of we have ordered this to be written in presence of our correspondence at Crawford-John, March 1, 1714, and subscribed in our name by Hu[gh]. Clerk, c[ler]k.”

=== Etymology ===
The name 'Barbrough' is said by the Ordnance Survey to mean 'the whizzing town', derived from the humming noise from the lint manufacturing process The name 'Lintmill Pool' is thought to come from a previous use of the mill for the preparation of lint or linen from flax (Linum usitatissimum) however it is also noted that flax (Linum usitatissimum) was left in various deep 'lint pools' along the river as part of the retting or rotting process that came before the flax was taken to be processed in the mill. Barburgh was recorded as 'Bridburgh' in 1247 and may derive from 'Bridda's Fort' or the 'Fort of the Birds'.

The first record of the name in 1747-1755 possibly reads as 'Bolybruchhead' and may indicate a fort linking to Watson's confused details of a 'Bar Brugh', the 'Defence Fort', a circular fort near Cairns Farm.

== Death records for Barburgh Mill ==
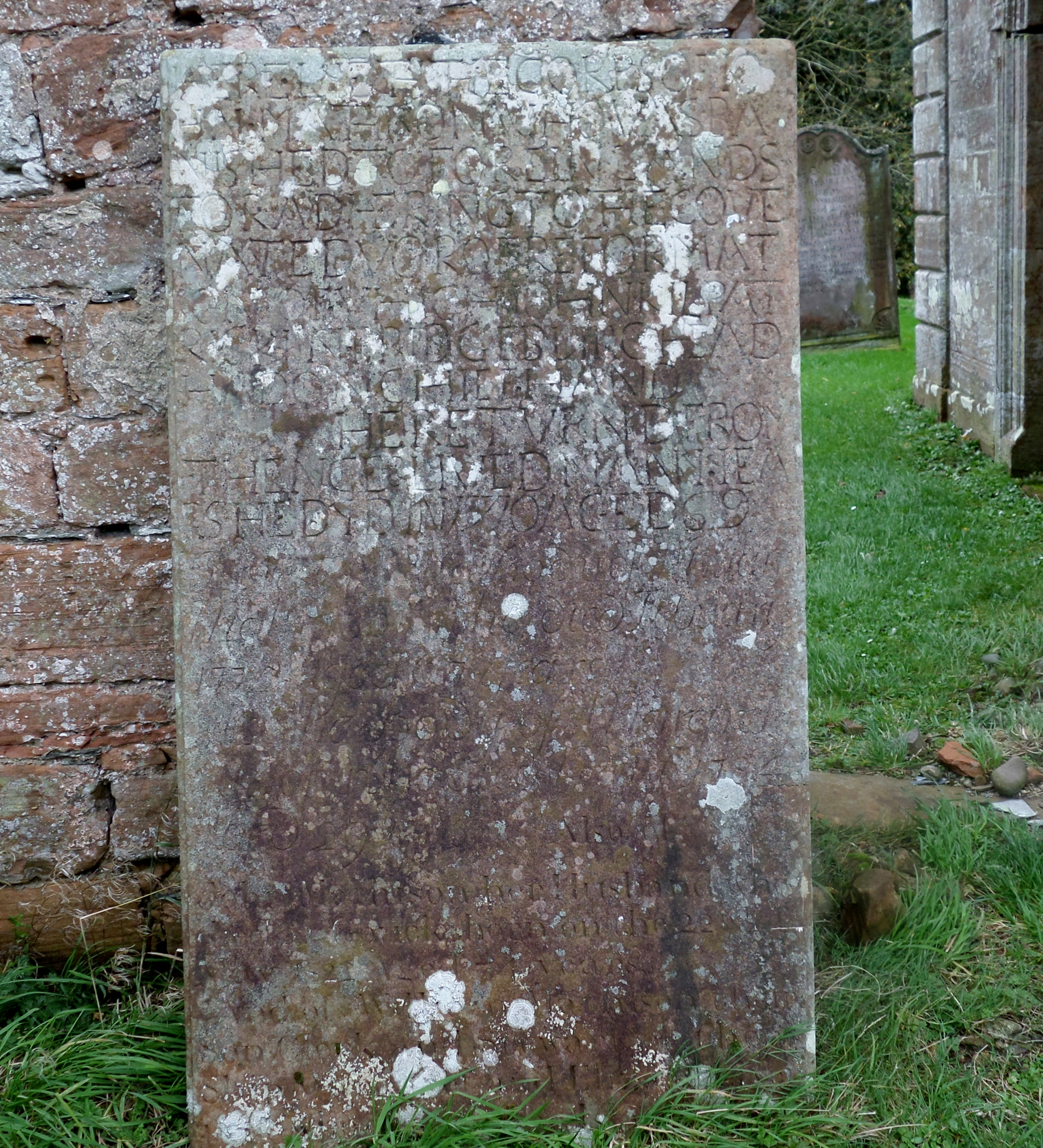
The gravestone of the Covenanter James Mathieson at Closeburn cemetery.

These details are mainly taken from the inscriptions on the gravestones at Dalgarnock and show a variety of versions of the 'Barburgh' place name: - On 28 March 1872 William Grassie died at Barburgh Mill aged 40 and was buried at the Dalgarnock Cemetery where his memorial still stands. On 16 October 1852 Agnes Maxwell died at Burbraugh Mill aged 4 years. Agnes's parents were William Maxwell and Elizabeth Bennoch. She was also buried at the Dalgarnock Cemetery with her parents. In 1704 John Nivison of Barbouy (Barburgh) placed a memorial to his father, who had been the miller at Closeburn at Dalgarnock Cemetery. On 5 February 1867 James Mackie McKerlie, manufacturer, aged 24, died at the mill and on 7 January 1867 his wife Mary Ann Mackie also died at the mill, aged 51. Isabella Love, daughter of John and Henrietta McKerlie, died at the mill on 15 July 1871 aged 18 months. John McKerlie later moved to the woollen mill at Cample Mill and died aged 60 from injuries acquired from an accident at Campleslacks in 1881. John Jackson was present at Barbarock Mill circa 1840–1850.

In British usage Enterkinfoot is technically a hamlet rather than a village as it has always lacked a formal dedicated church of its own.

== See also ==
- Dalgarnock Village, Church and Parish
- Meikle Millbank Mill
- Millmannoch
- Coldstream Mill
- Nether Mill
