= Dalgarnock =

Coordinates: 55.2242°N 3.7646°W

Dalgarnock: Scottish Gaelic: Dalgaranach; Dalgarno
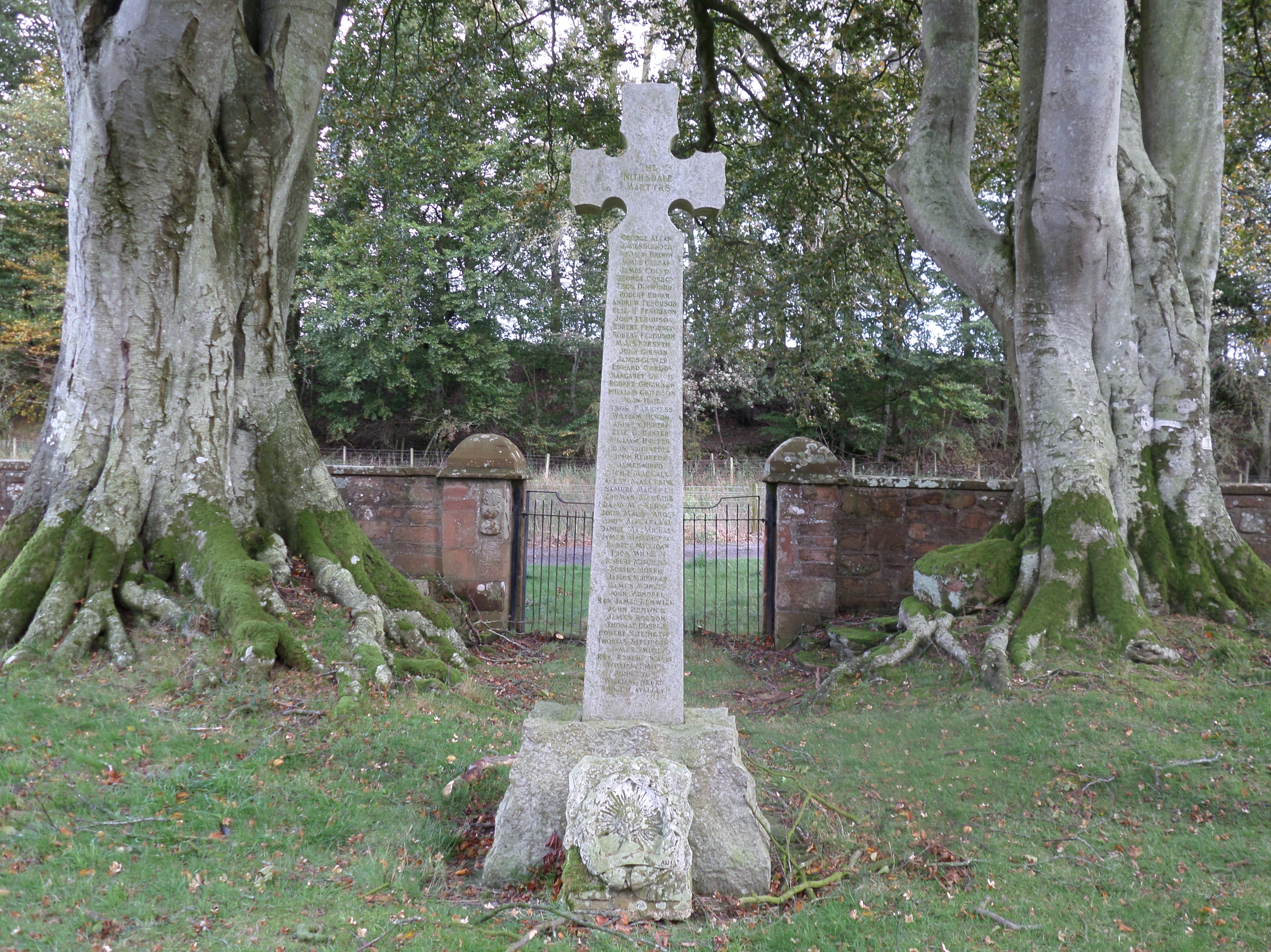
- Dalgarnock Churchyard entrance and Martyrs Cross

- Location within Dumfries and Galloway
- OS grid reference: NX878936
- Council area: Dumfries and Galloway
- Lieutenancy area: Dumfries
- Country: Scotland
- Sovereign state: United Kingdom
- Post town: Thornhill
- Postcode district: DG3
- Police: Scotland
- Fire: Scottish
- Ambulance: Scottish
- UK Parliament: Dumfriesshire, Clydesdale and Tweeddale
- Scottish Parliament: Dumfriesshire

Dalgarnock, Dalgarno, Dalgarnoc was an ancient parish and a once considerably sized village in the Nithsdale area of Dumfries and Galloway, Scotland, south of Sanquhar and north of Dumfries that enclosed the parish of Closeburn but was annexed to Closeburn in 1606 following the Reformation, separated again in 1648 and finally re-united in 1697, as part of the process that established the Presbyterian Church of Scotland. It was a burgh of regality bordering the River Nith and Cample Water and held a popular market-tryst or fair from medieval times until 1601 when the Earl of Queensberry had them transferred to Thornhill, commemorated in song by Robert Burns, shortly before its demise and now only a remote churchyard remains at a once busy site.

== History ==
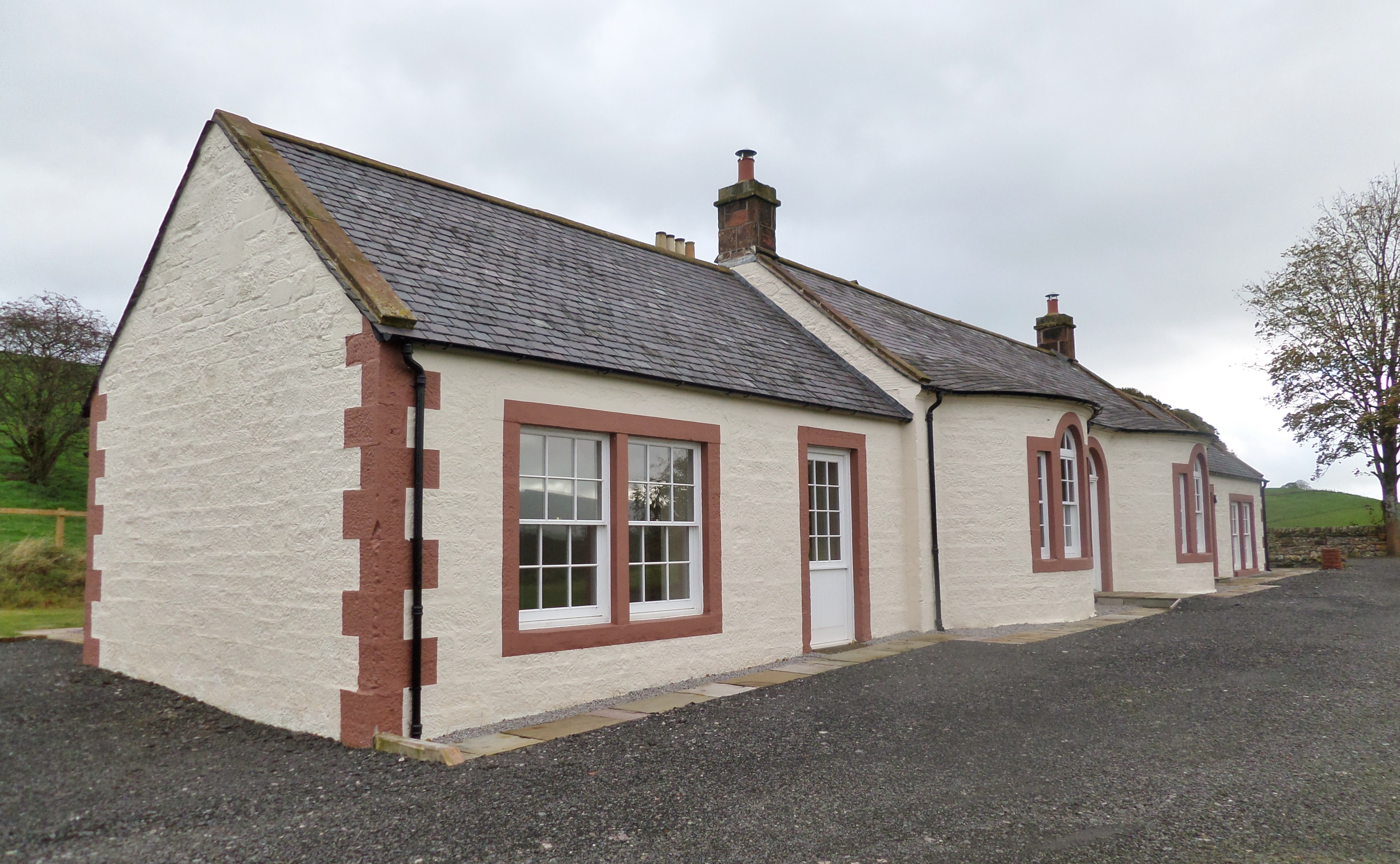
The old Rosebank Cottage stands nearby.

No houses remained in the 1790s, according to the 'Statistical Account for Closeburn' of the once sizeable village, however its location was still familiar to locals in the 1950s and some traces of it could be made out to the east of the churchyard in a pasture centred on NX 878 936. A ford ran across the River Nith towards Keir Mill via Blawplain farm from Dalgarnock that was out of use by 1899. The nearby town of Thornhill was initially named 'New Dalgarnock' by the earl when only a small village, having been built in 1717 on the then Earl of Queensberry's Estate lands, straddling the main coach road linking Dumfries to Glasgow.

=== The old church and churchyard ===
Dalgarnock church (NX 8758 9362) stood about a mile south of Thornhill, dedicated to St Michael and granted to Holyrood Abbey by Edgar, son of Duvenald of Strathnith and confirmed by William the Lion. Edgar was the grandson of Donegal, a Scots-Irish chief, during the reign of David I (died 1153) who is said to have held Nithsdale or Strathnith with a castle at the site of the later Morton Castle near Durisdeer. The monks held the church until the reformation. The location may have been chosen owing to the rich lands of the holm bordering the River Nith.

A person just recorded as Andrew is recorded in 1296 as the vicar of Dalgarnock, having sworn fealty to the English king Edward I, despite which in 1296 he had to petition the Sheriff of Dumfries to return the church to him. The church was confirmed to the Holyrood Abbey monks by William, Bishop of Glasgow, in 1240, by John Lindsay, Bishop of Glasgow in 1322-3 and by the Pope. From 1568 to 1585, the reader at the church was James Williamson, who received a stipend and the use of the church lands of Kirkbog and Kirkland, the glebe of four and a half acres originally being located near Trigony. In 1593, Richard Brown served the church, followed by David Rogers in 1601 and Alexander Fleming in 1612.

The income from the church went to the Bishop of Edinburgh and after the reformation were used to help maintain Edinburgh Castle.

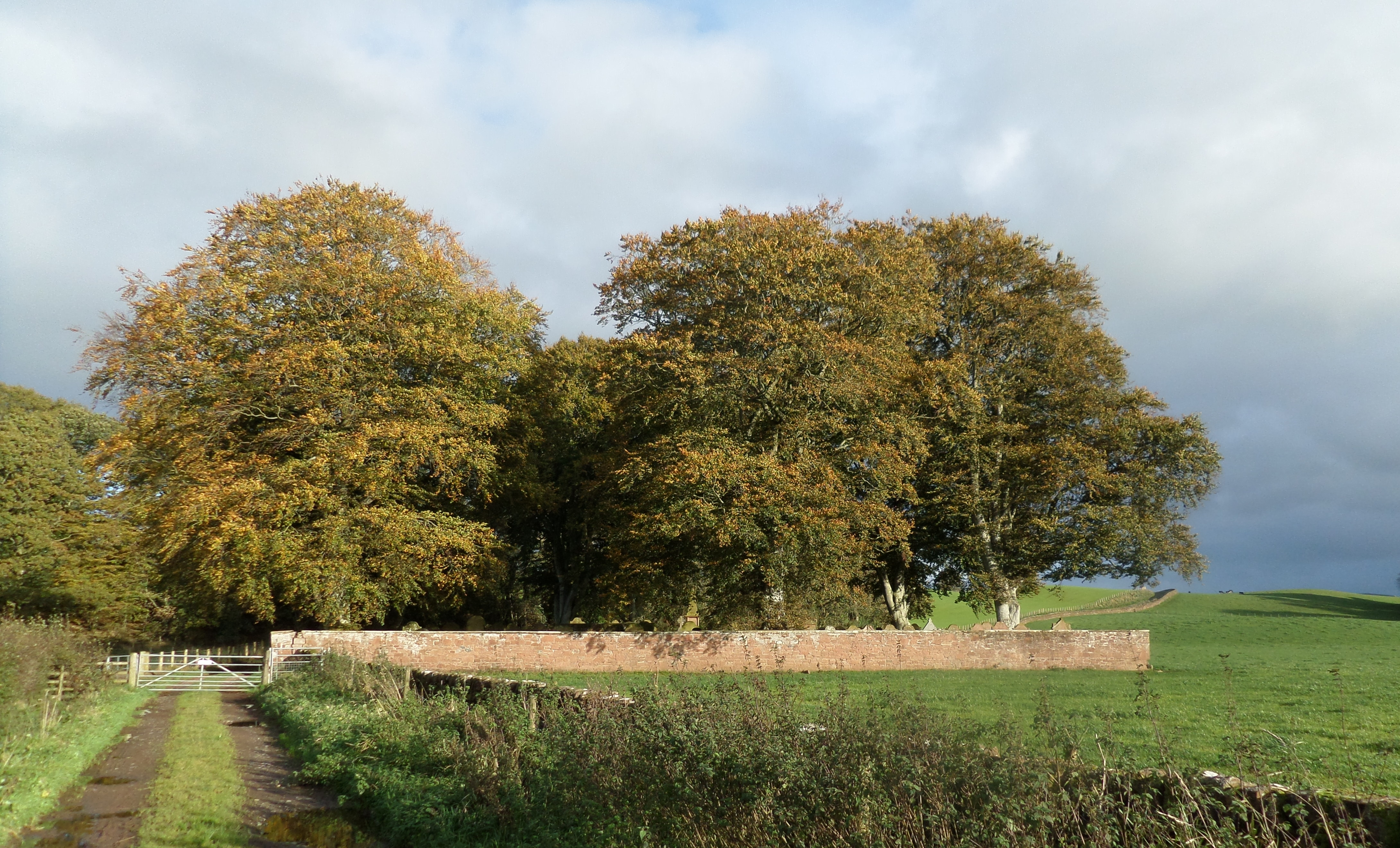
Dalgarnock burial ground from Kirkbog Farm lane.

After the Reformation, Dalgarnock was granted to Sir James Douglas of Drumlanrig, who then passed it in 1594 to Thomas Kirkpatrick of Closeburn. In 1621, King Charles I granted it to Sir John Spotiswoode. However, in 1633, the king established the bishopric of Edinburgh and granted them the church of Dalgarnock, with the manse, glebe, church lands and tithes, with a number of other churches which had belonged to the monastery of Holyrood Abbey. Kirkpatrick of Closeburn obtained the church and it stayed with that family until 1783 when it was sold to Menteth of Closeburn who in 1852 sold it to Douglas Baird, Esq., however he died in 1854 and is buried in Closeburn parish church cemetery with his wife Charlotte who died in 1864.

Annexed to Closeburn in 1606, the church fell out of use in the 18th century when all services were transferred to Closeburn and has entirely disappeared due to robbing for the building of field dykes and near by houses with only the font surviving, preserved in the porch of Closeburn Church at first and then returned to Dalgarnock where it has been given a stand made from sections of possibly pre-reformation gravestone sections. Some ruins remained until the early 1800s. The parish was disjoined in 1648 and rejoined again in 1697.

The Category B listed churchyard contains several 17th and 18th-century gravestones and a collective memorial to the Covenanter martyrs of the Nithsdale district. A cross's socket stone stood in a rectangular slot to the left of the churchyard entrance in 1950, however although this had been removed by the 1970s it was present again in 2017. One of the older graves is that of Nicola McMillan, wife of William Ferguson, who died aged thirty in 1754. However, a grave dated 1694 stands against the west wall with the village name given as Dalgarnock. Burials were still taking place in the 1850s. A family burial plot of the Menteths of Closeburn dominates part of the burial ground. The oldest recorded grave is that of 'Iohn Smith Barnhil D Ian 1607'.

A very unusual grave, given the Presbyterian links, is that of John Nivison, a surgeon who died in 1732, aged 42. His gravestone also commemorates his wife and four of his children. In addition to the traditional elements a figure is carved with arms that form part of a Green Man on the chest and foliage that reaches to the ground. In pagan religious beliefs such figures are seen as a symbol of rebirth, representing the cycle of growth each season.

=== Cartographic evidence ===
Timothy Pont's map of 1583-96 clearly marks the 'Kirk of Dalgairnock'. In 1654, the 'Kirk of Daloairnock' is marked, with the same spelling in 1732, however in 1747 it is not shown at all, neither the church or the village. In 1804, 'Dalgarno' is shown with two buildings and no 'kirk' designation, 1821 and 1828 gives the same details. A gravestone dated 1694 gives the spelling as 'Dalgarnok'.

=== St Ninian's Well ===
Although recorded as St Ninian's Well (NX 8762 9365) on the Ordnance Survey map, it is also known as St Michael's Well, the same dedication as the Dalgarnock Church. A small well was filled in 1857, but was re-opened and in 1975 was visible with some stones around it, but overgrown. It seems to have been known locally and provided good cool and wholesome water. The well is now located in undergrowth and hard to see.

=== Covenanters ===
Claverhouse, known as 'Bloody Clavers' summoned the adult parishioners after the 'Enterkin Raid' near Drumlanrig Castle, where in 1684, a short battle took place in the Enterkin Pass' at Glenvalentine when Covenanters ambushed some of Claverhouse's soldiers with the intention of rescuing prisoners on their way to Edinburgh and some troopers were killed with some soon to be martyred Covenanters were released. 'Cruel Lag', as Sir Robert Grierson, 1st Baronet was known, is remembered as a notorious persecutor of the Covenanters who lived at Lag Tower near Dunscore and held lands in the parish of Dalgarnock at Nether and Lower Dalgarnock.

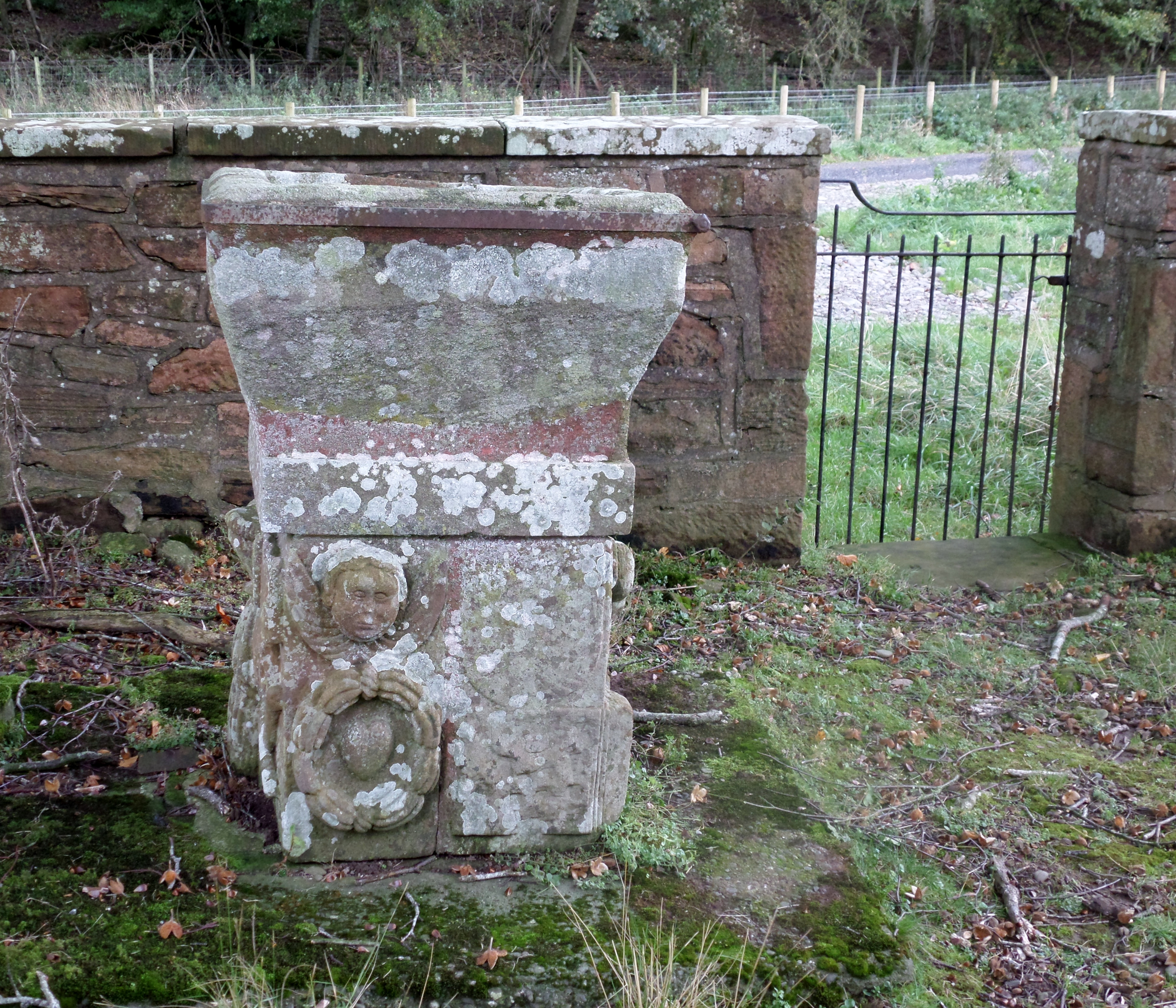
The old font, Dalgarnock Churchyard

A story is related to the marriage of the Covenanter John Porter and Agnes Milligan at Dalgarnock who was disturbed by the sudden arrival of the 'Cruel Lag', resulting in John trying to escape across the Nith, which was in flood using stilts, however some floating debris knocked him into the fast flowing waters at which point Agnes dived in to try and save him. The couple, it is said, were found drowned but in each other's arms at a site still known as Porter's Hole.

Some of the memorials are said to be the work of Robert Paterson, Sir Walter Scott's ‘Old Mortality’ himself.

The Covenanter Andrew Ferguson of Moniaive was buried here, together with many other Fergusons, following his death from disease in a Glasgow prison having been taken prisoner at a conventicle held at Glencairn.

The following Dalgarnock local inhabitants were declared "Outlaws and Fugitives" in May 1684 :

Alexander Nivison in Kirk-bog
Robert Dalziel in Cleughfoot, Dalgarnock
James Gilkerse in Holm of Dalgarnock
John Gilkerse in Holms of Dalgarnock

The white marble ten-and-a-half-foot Northumbrian Cross, the 'Martyrs Cross', that stands in the Dalgarnock burial ground was erected in 1925 and carved by D J Beattie & Son of Carlisle as a memorial to the 57 (54 men and three women) Nithsdale Covenanters who gave their lives for their faith. A letterbook relating to the erection of this cross was kept at Hornel Library, Kirkcudbright. In front of the 'Martyrs Cross' is a small stone given by Australian sympathisers and admirers.

The names of the martyrs are listed with the places and dates of death where known, taken from King-Hewison's book "Dalgarnoc: its Saints and Heroes" :

George Allan, Penpont
James Bennoch, Ingliston 1685
William Brown, Sanquhar
John Corsan, New Jersey 1685
James Colvin, Scarvating 1679
Geo. Corson, New Cumnock 1685
Thomas Dinwiddie, Bothwell 1679
Robert Edgar, Ingliston 1685
Andrew Ferguson, Glasgow 1685
Elizabeth Hunter Ferguson, Holland
Robt. Ferguson, Bothwell 1679
Robt. Ferguson, Auchencloy 1684
M(rs) Jas. Forsyth, Dunnottar 1685
John Gibson, Ingliston 1685
Jas. Glover, Edin. tolbooth 1685
Edward Gordon, Irongray 1685
Margaret Gracie, Penpont
Robert Grierson, Ingliston 1685
William Grierson, Dumfries 1667
John Hair, New Cumnock 1685
Thos. Harkness, Grassmarket 1684
William Heron, Lochenkit 1685
Andrew Hunter, Dumfries Prison
Elizabeth Hunter
William Hunter, Kirkcudbright 1684
John Johnstone, Bothwell 1679
John Kennedy
James Kirko, Dumfries 1685
John McCall, Bothwell Brig 1679
Alexr McCubine, Irongray 1685
Thomas McGirr, Bothwell 1679
David Mckervail
John McClamroes, Bothwell 1679
And. McLellan, Pitlochy’s ship 1685
Daniel McMichael, Dalveen 1683
James McMichael, Auchencloy 1684
Robert Milligan, Scarvating 1679
Robert Mitchell, Ingliston 1685
Robert Morris, Sanquhar
John Muirhead, Leith prison 1685
James Muncie, Edinburgh Prison
John Mundell, Edin. tolbooth 1685
Rev. James Renwick, Grassmarket 1685
John Renwick
James Robson, Bothwell 1679
Thos Rosper, Scarvating 1679
Robt. Sitlington, Bothwell 1679
Thos. Sitlington, Pitlochy’s ship 1685
James Smith, Bothwell 1679
Robert Smith, Kirkcudbright 1684
William Smith, Moniaive 1685
John Stot, Dunnottar 1685
William Welsh, Dumfries 1667
Andrew Wallet, Scarvating 1679

James Harkness was a farmer and is one of 38 members of his family who are buried here. He led the aforementioned 'Enterkin Raid' when he led a band of 40 Covenanters who rescued seven out of nine fellow Covenanters who were being taken to Edinburgh to be sold into slavery in America. He was captured by Claverhouse but escaped and fled to Ulster, only returning after the 'Killing Times' ended. His brother Thomas was hung at the Grassmarket in Edinburgh and his name will be found on the Martyrs' Cross. This is the famous Harkness family, who were staunch Covenanters with many stories told of their trials and tribulations.

His memorial reads :

Here lyes the body of James
Harkness in Locherben who
died 6th Dec. 1723 aged 72 years
Bel o this stone his dust doth ly
who in dured 28 years
porsecuti on by tiranny
:Did him persue with echo & cry
through many a lonsome place
at last by Clavers he was tane
Sentenced for to dy
But God who for his soul took care
did him from prison bring
Because no other cause they had
But that he could not give up
With Christ his Glorious king,
and swear alligence to that beast
the duke of york, i mean.
In spite of all there hellish rage
a naturel death he died
in full asurance of his rest
with Christ eternally

The Parish of Closeburn and Dalgarnock had to pay "Fines and Losses" of £3,671 18s.

=== Conventicles ===
On Saturday 25 July 1925, a Conventicle was held in the Dalgarnock Kikrkyard by the Rev. Charles Rolland Ramsay of Closeburn Church, assisted by other local clergy. The intention was to publicly commemorate the sacrifice of the Nithsdale Covenanters and an appeal was made for funds to provide a memorial for the martyrs and to restore the kirkyard and its graves.

On 22 July 1928, a second Conventicle was held to unveil and dedicate the Northumbrian style 'Martyrs Cross', Mr John Cunninghame Montgomerie of Dalmore performing the official unveiling. A large number of people were in attendance as were a large united choir and the regimental band of the 7th Battalion of the Cameronian Territorial Regiment, commanded by Lieut. Colonel Vandaluer. A religious service was held and several clergy of other denominations also participated. A number of descendants of the martyrs were present, including several of the Harkness family.

A further conventicle was held in the Dalgarnock burial ground in 2013.

=== Robert Burns ===
Burns makes reference to Dalgarnock in the 1795 song "Last May a Braw Wooer", in which the lady singer complains that a man who she was playing hard to get with transferred his affections to her cousin "..up the Gateslack". Ellisland Farm is only a few miles to the south and Burns saw Dalgarnock as a romantic spot beside the River Nith.

"But a' the neist week, as I fretted wi' care,
I gaed to the tryst o' Dalgarnock;
And wha but my fine fickle lover was there!
I glowr'd as I'd seen a warlock, a warlock;
I glowr'd as I'd seen a warlock."

"But owre my left shouther I gae him a blink,
Lest neibours might say I was saucy;
My wooer he caper'd as he'd been in drink,
And vow'd I was his dear lassie, dear lassie,
And vow'd I was his dear lassie."

 .    .    .   .   .   .    .   .   .   .

"He begged, for Gudesake! I wad be his wife,
Or else I wad kill him wi'sorrow:
Soe'en to preserve the poor body in life,
I think I maun wed him to-morrow, to-morrow;
I think I main wed him to-morrow."

== Place names ==
Many derivations of the name Dalgarnock have been proposed, such as 'field with the short hill' from the Scots Gaelic dail gearr enoc. The name has been suggested as relating to the sound of the River Nith as 'Holm of the cry' from the Scots Gaelic Dail gair. It has even been suggested that the name derives from the Old Norman French De la garnoca meaning 'a large enclosure for cattle' as used in the 'High and Low Garnes Parks' behind Nethermains Farm and linking with the ancient cattle fairs or trysts held here. Several farms and habitations carry names relating to Dalgarnock such as Kirkbog, Kirkland, Kirkland Cottage, Dalgarnock Gate, Over and Nether Dalgarnock, etc. The name Dalgarnock is in use as a surname and has been shortened to 'Dalgairns'. A 1694 gravestone records the spelling 'Dalgarnok'.

== Archaeology ==
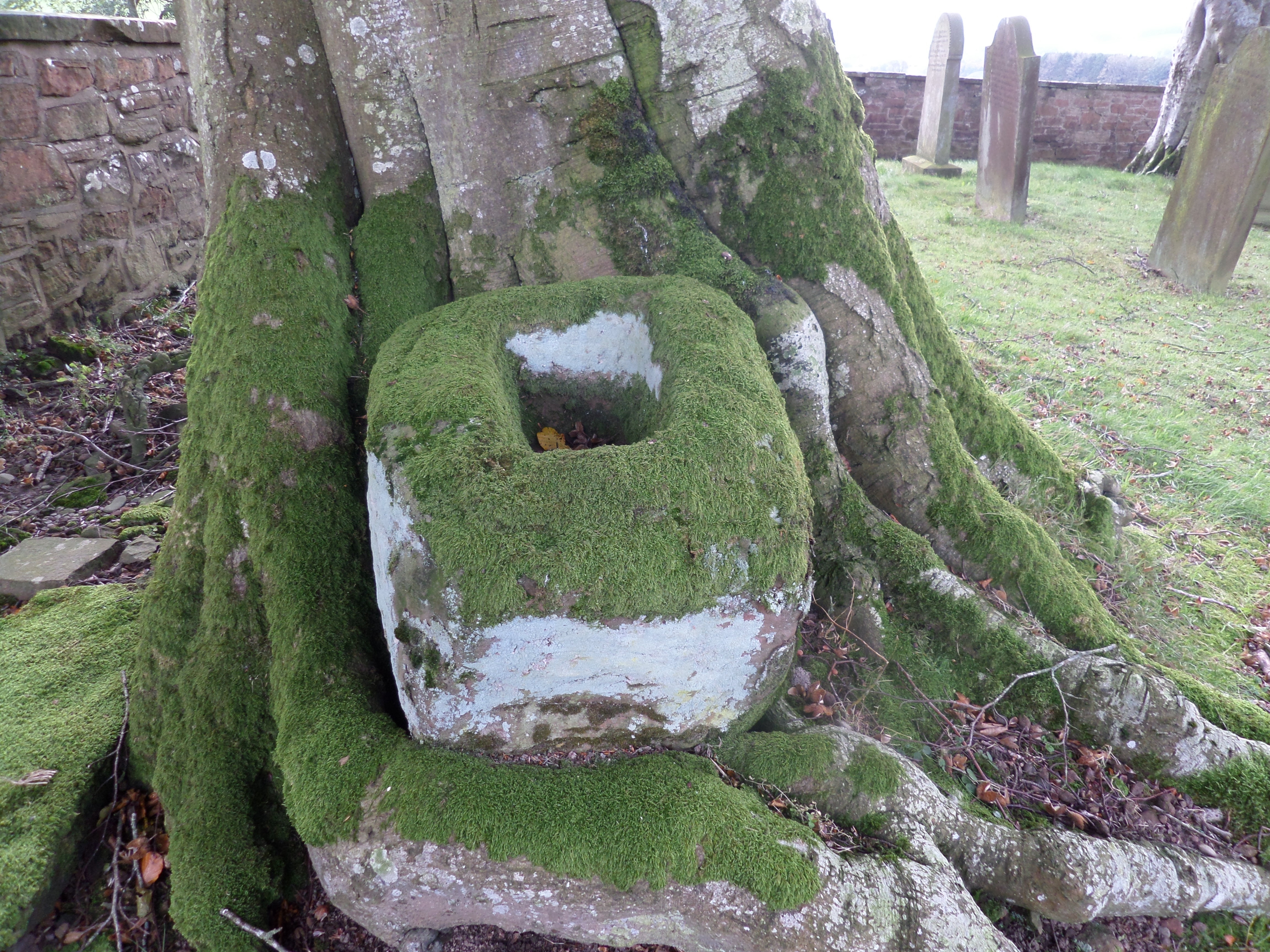
Old church cross base.

At nearby Rosebank is located the cropmark of a round barrow, circular in plan with a central pit and surrounded by a 1.9m ditch. Possible Roman road quarry pits have been identified close by towards the east. A stone circle (NX 87718384) stood near Templeland with only a single stone now remaining. The Ordnance Survey map marks the Gallows Hill (see video) near the Cample Water that lies to the north of the Dalgarnock Barony and may have been the moot hill location for the barony court and pit and gallows site.

== The Buchanites ==
Elspeth Buchan was the leader of the Buchanites, an extreme religious sect who, in the 1780s, settled for a time at the nearby farm of New Cample where they built a dwelling known locally as 'Buchan Ha', the ruins of which still survive (datum 2017). Circa 1785 all forty-six or so of her followers met at a wooden platform they had built on Templand Hill above Dalgarnock, with the hope of ascending to heaven with their leader Luckie Buchan. They had shaved their hair, leaving a central tuft by which the angels would pull them up to heaven. The platform collapsed and the Buchanites left for a new home at Auchengibbert in Galloway shortly after.

== The McMilligan of Dalgarnock Spectre ==
At Tynron can be seen the landmark peak of Tynron Doon. The spectre of a headless horseman riding a black horse is said to lurk. The legend is "The ghost was that of a young gentleman of the family of M‘Milligan of Dalgarnock, who had gone to offer his addresses to the daughter of the Laird of Tynron Castle. His presence was objected to, however, by one of the young lady’s brothers. Hot words followed, and in high wrath the suitor rode off; but mistaking his way he galloped over the steepest part of the hill and broke his neck, and so, with curses and words of evil on his very lips, his spirit was not allowed to pass untroubled to the realms beyond."

== See also ==
- Barburgh Mill, Closeburn
- Hallhill Covenanter Martyrs Memorial

== Bibliography ==
- Hewison, James (1935). Dalgarnoc : Its Saint and Heroes. Courier Press.
- Watson, R. (1901). Closeburn (Dumfriesshire). Reminiscent, Historic & Traditional. Inglis Ker & Co.
- Wright, Margaret (2005). Dalgarnock Kirkyard Memorial Inscriptions. Dumfries and Galloway Family Research Centre.
