= List of listed buildings in Durisdeer, Dumfries and Galloway =

This is a list of listed buildings in the parish of Durisdeer in Dumfries and Galloway, Scotland.

== List ==
Name	Location	Date Listed	Grid Ref. (Note: Sometimes known as OSGB36, the grid reference (where provided) is based on the British national grid reference system used by the Ordnance Survey. • "Guide to National Grid". Ordnance Survey. • "Get-a-map". Ordnance Survey.)	Geo-coordinates	Notes	LB Number (Note: Historic Environment Scotland assign a unique alphanumeric identifier to each designated site in Scotland, for listed buildings this always begins with "LB", for example "LB12345".)	Image
Carronbridge Mill Office And Former Cartshed				55°15′37″N 3°46′59″W	Category B	3867	Upload Photo
Coshogle Farmhouse And Steading				55°19′33″N 3°47′47″W	Category B	3880	Upload Photo
Coshogle Cottage				55°19′43″N 3°47′33″W	Category C(S)	3881	Upload Photo
Crairiepark Farmhouse And Steading				55°19′07″N 3°48′57″W	Category B	3883	Upload Photo
Drumlanrig Creel Bridge				55°17′08″N 3°48′12″W	Category B	3889	Upload Photo
Durisdeer Village Hope Cottage				55°18′54″N 3°44′41″W	Category C(S)	3859	Upload Photo
Durisdeer Village Rose Cottage				55°18′55″N 3°44′40″W	Category C(S)	3870	Upload Photo
Enterkin Viaduct				55°19′10″N 3°48′05″W	Category B	3872	Upload Photo
Crairiehill Farmhouse And Steading				55°18′47″N 3°48′23″W	Category B	3882	Upload Photo
Drumlanrig Bridge Cottage				55°16′49″N 3°47′49″W	Category B	3888	Upload another image
Drumlanrig Mains Offices, Sawmill And Workshops				55°16′54″N 3°48′31″W	Category B	3893	Upload Photo
Sweetbit Farmhouse And Steading				55°18′22″N 3°48′15″W	Category B	3860	Upload Photo
18-22 (Numbers Inclusive) Carronbridge Village				55°15′52″N 3°46′50″W	Category B	3864	Upload Photo
Carronbridge Village Miss Findlater (Formerly Smithy Cottage) Former Smithy And Smithy Cottage				55°15′53″N 3°46′49″W	Category C(S)	3865	Upload Photo
Carronbridge Village Moss Side House And Gatepiers				55°16′01″N 3°46′56″W	Category B	3868	Upload Photo
Gateslack Farmhouse				55°18′12″N 3°44′52″W	Category B	3873	Upload Photo
Holestane Farmhouse, Steading, Dairy And Outbuildings				55°16′49″N 3°46′36″W	Category B	3876	Upload Photo
Priestcrown Wood Railway Embankment				55°19′27″N 3°48′34″W	Category B	3879	Upload Photo
Dalveen Farm Martyr's Monument				55°20′40″N 3°45′40″W	Category B	3885	Upload Photo
Ballagan North Range Of Steading (Former Stable, Cartshed And Barn)				55°17′33″N 3°50′21″W	Category B	3896	Upload Photo
Drumlanrig Summer House North Of Duchess Well				55°16′23″N 3°48′48″W	Category B	3854	Upload Photo
Durisdeer Village Durisdeer Parish Church, Queensberry Mausoleum, Former School/Vestry And Churchyard				55°18′56″N 3°44′39″W	Category A	3856	Upload Photo
Durisdeer Village Castlehill Cottage				55°18′57″N 3°45′10″W	Category C(S)	3857	Upload Photo
Carronbridge Village Carronfoot House				55°15′47″N 3°47′06″W	Category B	3866	Upload Photo
Kirkbride Churchyard				55°19′54″N 3°48′25″W	Category B	3877	Upload Photo
Dalveen Farm House Steading And Barn				55°20′37″N 3°45′39″W	Category B	3884	Upload Photo
Drumlanrig Bridge (Drumlanrig Castle East Approach Over River Nith				55°16′47″N 3°47′49″W	Category B	3887	Upload another image
Drumlanrig Laundry Cottages				55°16′36″N 3°48′38″W	Category B	3892	Upload Photo
Alton Farmhouse And Steading				55°17′49″N 3°48′22″W	Category B	3894	Upload Photo
Drumlanrig St Geoffrey's Bridge				55°16′17″N 3°49′01″W	Category C(S)	3853	Upload another image
Carronbank Cottage And Outbuildings				55°17′33″N 3°45′42″W	Category B	3862	Upload Photo
Glenarlie Bridge				55°19′51″N 3°50′15″W	Category B	3874	Upload Photo
Drumlanrig Gardener's Cottage (At Flower Garden)				55°16′23″N 3°48′23″W	Category C(S)	3890	Upload Photo
Drumlanrig Glass House In Flower Garden				55°16′23″N 3°48′23″W	Category B	3891	Upload another image
Ardoch Farmhouse And Steading				55°19′45″N 3°49′54″W	Category B	3895	Upload Photo
Drumlanrig Cottages At Drumlanrig Mains				55°16′52″N 3°48′34″W	Category C(S)	3852	Upload Photo
Durisdeer Village Glenview Mr Henson				55°18′54″N 3°44′38″W	Category B	3858	Upload Photo
Carron Water And A702 Railway Viaduct				55°17′29″N 3°45′52″W	Category B	3861	Upload Photo
Carronbridge Village Carron Bridge (A76 Over Carron Water)				55°15′51″N 3°46′49″W	Category B	3863	Upload Photo
Drumlanrig Summerhouse To South West Of Mansion				55°16′23″N 3°48′48″W	Category B	3855	Upload another image
Durisdeer Mill Village Old Foot Bridge Over Carron Water				55°19′07″N 3°45′42″W	Category B	3871	Upload Photo
Hapland Farmhouse And Steading				55°18′56″N 3°47′30″W	Category B	3875	Upload Photo
Chapel Farmhouse And Steading				55°19′49″N 3°45′58″W	Category B	3869	Upload Photo
Drumlanrig Castle, Outbuildings and Pavilion Blocks Piers, Balustrades and Quadrant Walls and Garden Urns				55°16′25″N 3°48′31″W	Category A	3886	Upload another image See more images

== Key ==
The scheme for classifying buildings in Scotland is:

- Category A: "buildings of national or international importance, either architectural or historic; or fine, little-altered examples of some particular period, style or building type."
- Category B: "buildings of regional or more than local importance; or major examples of some particular period, style or building type, which may have been altered."
- Category C: "buildings of local importance; lesser examples of any period, style, or building type, as originally constructed or moderately altered; and simple traditional buildings which group well with other listed buildings."

In March 2016 there were 47,288 listed buildings in Scotland. Of these, 8% were Category A, and 50% were Category B, with the remaining 42% being Category C.
