= Enterkinfoot =

Village in Dumfries and Galloway, Scotland

Coordinates: 55.3172°N 3.7983°W

Enterkinfoot and the Enterkin Pass
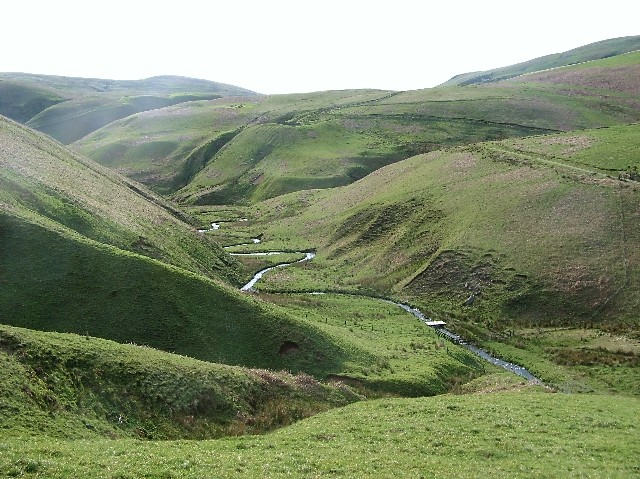
- The Enterkin Pass, path and burn

- Location within Dumfries and Galloway
- OS grid reference: NS 8597 0404
- Council area: Dumfries and Galloway
- Country: Scotland
- Sovereign state: United Kingdom
- Police: Scotland
- Fire: Scottish
- Ambulance: Scottish
- UK Parliament: Dumfries and Galloway

Enterkinfoot is a small village or hamlet which lies 6 miles (9.7 km) north of Thornhill on the A76 on the route to Sanquhar, in Dumfriesshire, Durisdeer Parish, in Dumfries and Galloway, south-west Scotland. Its original nucleus was the old mill with associated buildings, the school and the famous Enterkin Pass and path that followed the course of the Enterkin Glen to Wanlockhead and from there to Edinburgh. The site features the A76 that runs through the centre of Enterkinfoot, the River Nith and the Enterkin Burn that once powered the mill before joining the Nith. The area is famous for its association with the Covenanters.

== History ==
The village is now consistently known as 'Enterkinfoot' and the stream recorded as the 'Enterkin Burn' with its source 5 miles (8.0 km) away on the western slope of Lowther Hill. The burn has its confluence here with the River Nith. The area is famous for its association with the Covenanters and the events of the so-called 'Killing Times' that occurred during the reigns of Charles II and James VII and II and eventually led to the establishment of the Presbyterian Church of Scotland. A number of small cottages, many owned by the Duke of Buccleuch, made up the original village, some of which are still occupied. A public house stood next to the Enterkin Burn on the southern side.

Enterkinfoot School and schoolhouse was situated near the cottages at Auchenbraith. A holy well is shown at the 'Holywell Cleuch' above Hapland Farm (with no recorded history) with a branch of the Enterkin Path running up the glen on the eastern side. A ford crossed the Nith at Auchenbraith.

=== Enterkinfoot Mill and Burn ===
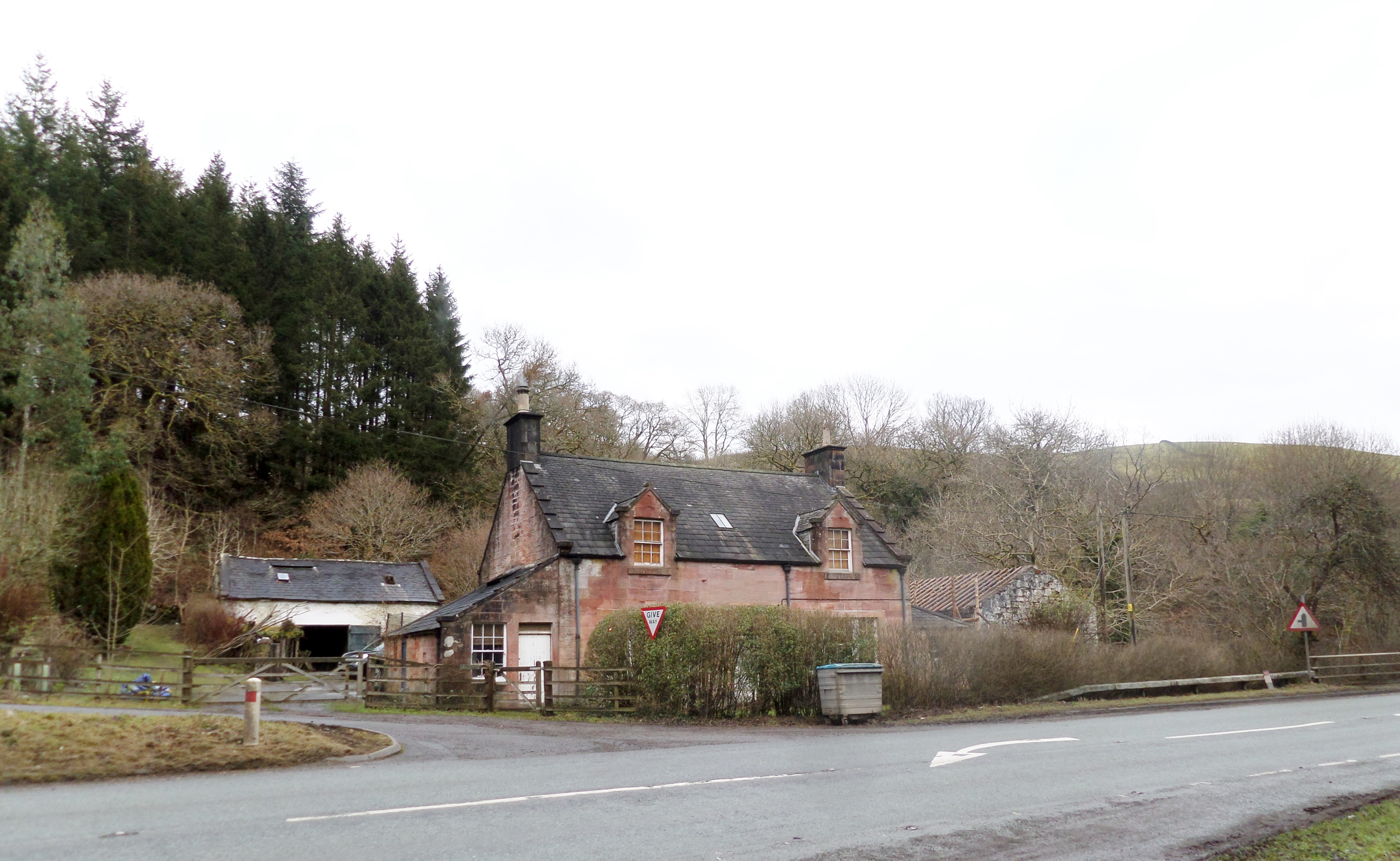
Enterkinfoot Mill miller's house

Timothy Pont's map of circa 1583-96 shows 'Interk (?) Mill' at the same position (NS 857042) as the later mill. The 1654 Joan Blaeu map also records a 'Mill of Inter'. The burn is recorded as 'Interkyn' in 1745. Roy's map records 'Entrikin Foot', 'Water of Entrican' and the 'Entriken Path'. In 1776 Entrakinfoot is the spelling used. Enterkine Foot is marked on Crawford's 1804 map. By 1898 the more recent two storey mill is marked as a meal mill rather than a corn mill. The mill no longer survives. The miller's house is of a red sandstone construction and the lean-to extensions at each gable end once housed a smithy and a shop respectively. An older mill stands alongside, with various outbuildings, a cobbled courtyard, small walled garden and an old pig sty. The lade ran down as a wooden trough carrying the water from a sluice near the railway viaduct, splitting into a spillway and the lade to the wheel on the other side of the road.

=== Coshogle Castle ===
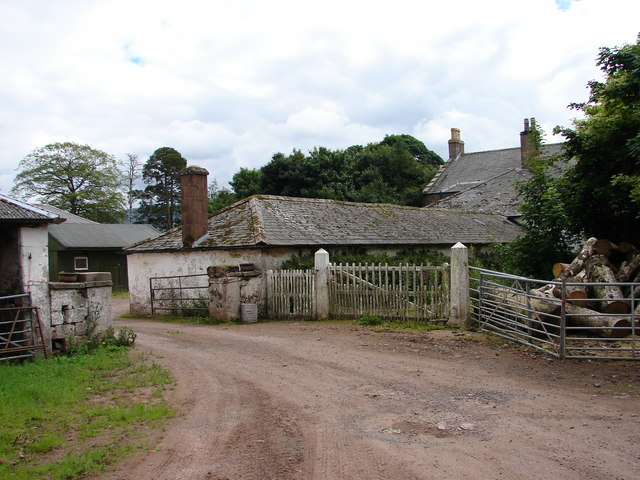
Coshogle Farm.

Coshogle Castle once overlooked Enterkinfoot, held by the clan Douglas, it stood near Old Coshogle Farm however nothing now remains at the site although some features from it are incorporated into nearby cottages, namely a doorway with an arch and moulded jambs, and secondly a marriage stone with two coat of arms, the date 1576, initials RD and NJ for Robert Douglas and his wife Nicola Johnston. Sections of the castle walls stood 6 foot high and 6 foot thick survived at least until 1825.

=== Morton Castle ===
Morton is first recorded as being held in the 12th century by Dunegal, Lord of Strathnith (Nithsdale) and then by Thomas Randolph, Earl of Moray. The location of the surviving ruins stand on an elevated and highly defendable promontory surrounded on three sides by an artificial loch, originally only a marshland. The 1357 Treaty of Berwick in 1357 required the Scots to destroy Morton and thirteen other castles in Nithsdale. The Earl of March probably built much of the existing castle in the early 15th century, however, James Douglas of Dalkeith, Earl of Morton. In 1608 the castle was sold to William Douglas of Coshogle, William Douglas of Drumlanrig then buying it ten years later. The castle may have served as a hunting lodge until around 1714. Morton is still the property of the Duke of Buccleuch in the care of Historic Environment Scotland.

=== Kirkbride Church ===
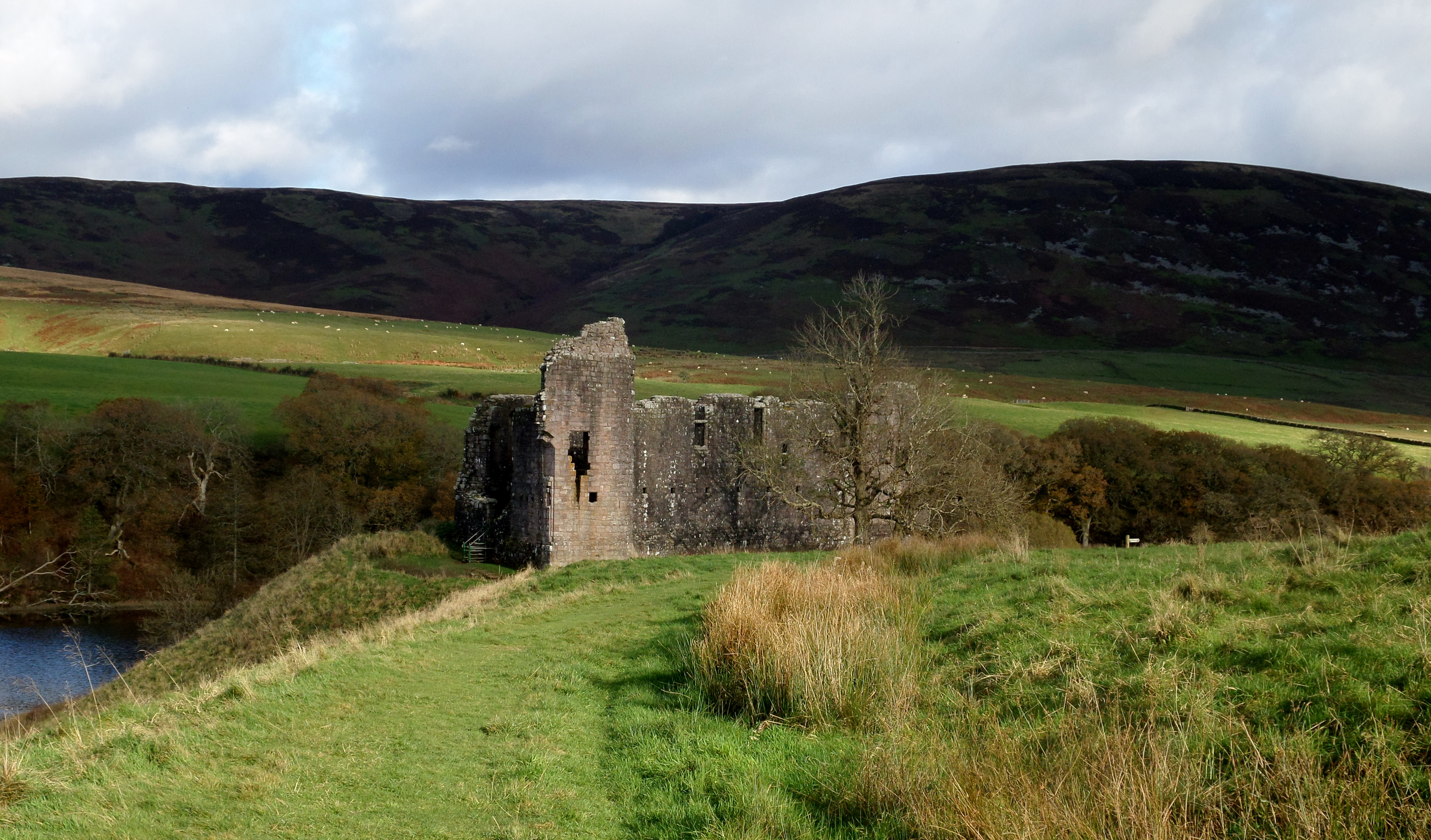
Morton Castle and loch

The ruins of this church and cemetery stand in a remote location above Enterkinfoot. In the 13th-century Holyrood Abbey held Kirkbride Church. In 1732 the parish was divided and annexed to the parishes of Durisdeer and Sanquhar. The remains on site today date from the early 16th century and a sacristy projects from the north wall. Kirkbride is said to be only the second reformed church built in Scotland. The church bell was stolen after its abandonment was and was traced to Glasgow where it had been recognised by the sound of it when rung it was brought back and re-hung in the small belfry on the gable end.

=== Enoch Castle ===
Enoch castle was the caput of the barony of that name, however, nothing remains at the site due to robbing the lay of the land shows it to have been a place of considerable strength. It was seized by the Douglas's of Morton Castle and attached to the clans land holdings.

== Transport ==
Enterkinfoot lies in Nithsdale, a natural communication corridor that has resulted in the main A76 road passing through it and railway the cutting through it a higher level with the Drumlanrig Tunnel near by. The Dumfries to Ayr road runs through on its way to Sanquhar from Carronbridge. The Duke of Queensberry constructed around 22 miles (35 km) of new road and in addition a road (the B797) through the Mennock Pass to the county boundary and onward to Edinburgh. The village never had a passenger station the nearest today being Sanquhar and previously a station was present at Carron Bridge.

== The Enterkin Pass and Path ==
The Enterkin Pass was one of the old routes, a bridle-path, running north from Nithsdale into Clydesdale, together with the nearby Mennock, Well and Dalveen Passes, crossing the Lowthers and then onwards to Edinburgh or Glasgow. Its origins may be a medieval travellers route or 16th century, made to facilitate the transport of lead from the mines by pack horses with panniers to Dumfries.

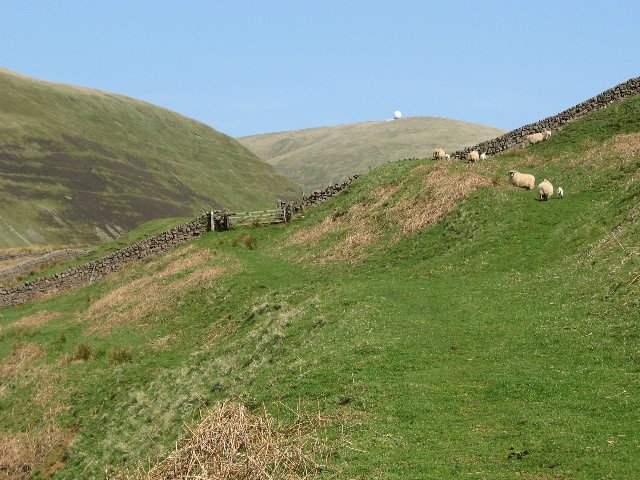
The Enterkin Pass and path

In 1726 Daniel Defoe writing in "A Tour Thro' the Whole Island of Great Britain" (1726) described the pass: "Enterkin, the frightfullest pass, and most dangerous that I met with, between that and Penmenmuir in North Wales".

Another author wrote that "A few steps and you are on its edge, looking down giddy and amazed into its sudden and immense depths. ... but we know nothing more noticeable, more unlike any other place, more impressive, than this short, deep, narrow, and sudden glen."

The original path and lane ran from near the school and was cut off by the railway, but it used to directly run from Enterkinfoot with another route from the south branching off from the Dalveen Pass road. The present-day path, going east from Wanlockhead passes around the west side of Stake Hill and joins the road to the radar station, leaving again to run south to the Enterkin Pass between Lowther Hill and East Mount Lowther. The path down is on the west bank of the Enterkin Burn for around 3 km until it reaches Glenvalentine from where it ascends in a southerly direction from the burn to the ridge above. Descending south from the ridge, there are views of Enterkin Glen. A metalled road is present near Inglestone and a public road runs via Muiryhill, turning west to the A76 Nithsdale road and thence to Enterkinfoot.

=== The rescue of the Covenanters ===
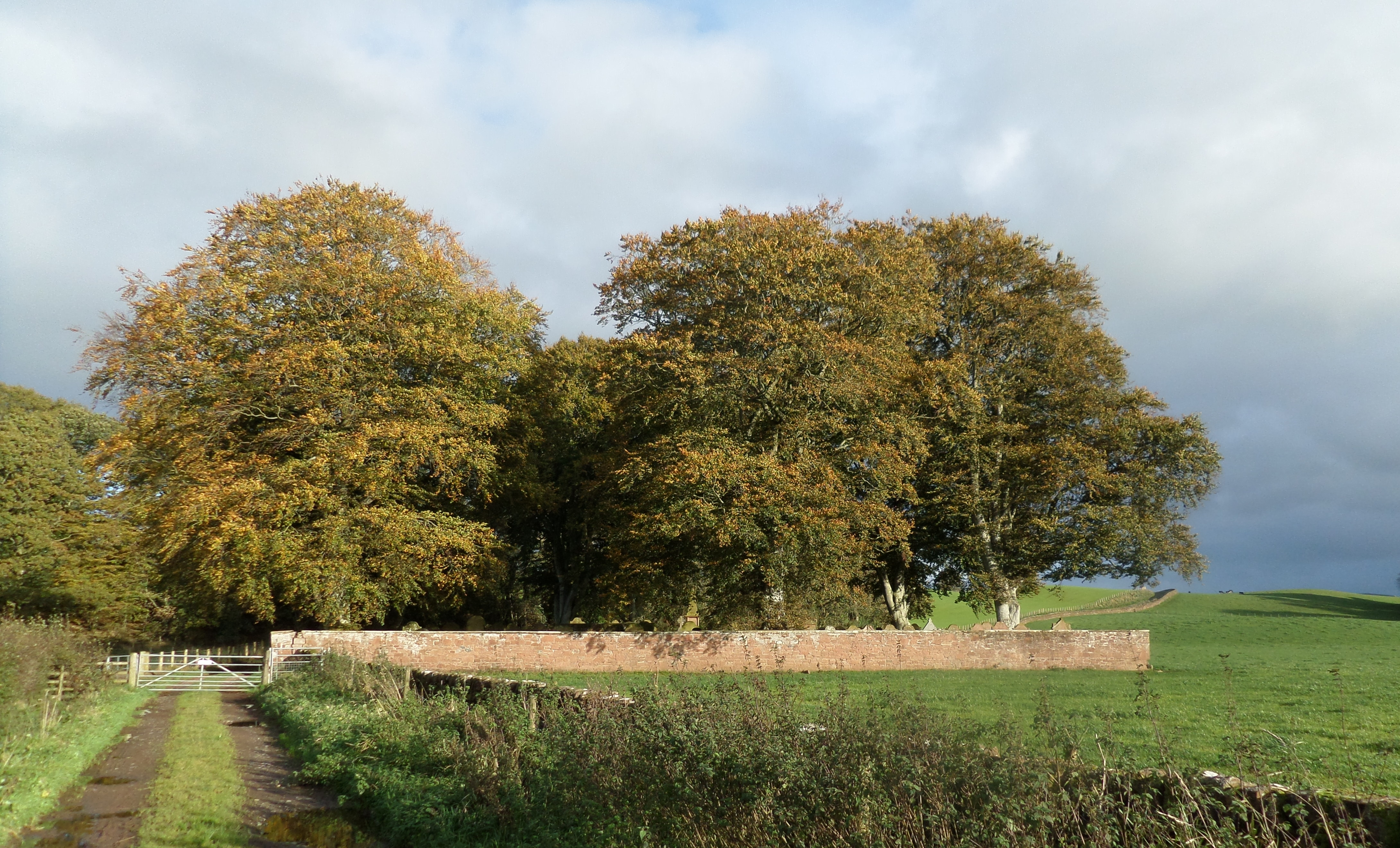
Dalgarnock Kirk where James Harkness is buried.

On 29 July 1684, the Enterkin Pass was the scene of a dramatic rescue, the 'Enterkin Raid' by twelve Covenanters of five of their colleagues and a minister who were under escort by soldiers taking them from Dumfries via Thornhill to Edinburgh. The leaders of the group were James and Thomas Harkness and the ambush was set at Glenvalentine confluence resulting in the officer commanding being shot through the head and the troops firing a single volley before surrendering their prisoners. It is reported that there were casualties on both sides. Five of the Covenanters, including Thomas Harkness, involved were caught soon after and executed at Edinburgh's Grassmarket, however James Harkness escaped to Ulster in Northern Ireland and his grave and story is still to be seen at Dalgarnock near Thornhill where his memorial read :-

Here lyes the body of James
Harkness in Locherben who
died 6th Dec. 1723 aged 72 years
Bel o this stone his dust doth ly
who in dured 28 years
porsecuti on by tiranny
:Did him persue with echo & cry
through many a lonsome place
at last by Clavers he was tane
Sentenced for to dy
But God who for his soul took care
did him from prison bring
Because no other cause they had
But that he could not give up
With Christ his Glorious king,
and swear alligence to that beast
the duke of york, i mean.
In spite of all there hellish rage
a naturel death he died
in full asurance of his rest
with Christ eternally

=== Drumlanrig Tunnel and retaining wall ===
The Duke of Buccleuch insisted that the railway be hidden from his seat at Drumlanrig Castle and this necessitated a 1,397-yard-long tunnel built by a workforce of 600 and requiring seven million bricks. The original contractor found the project too onerous. The tunnel opens at the south in the vicinity of the old Carronbridge railway station at NS880012.

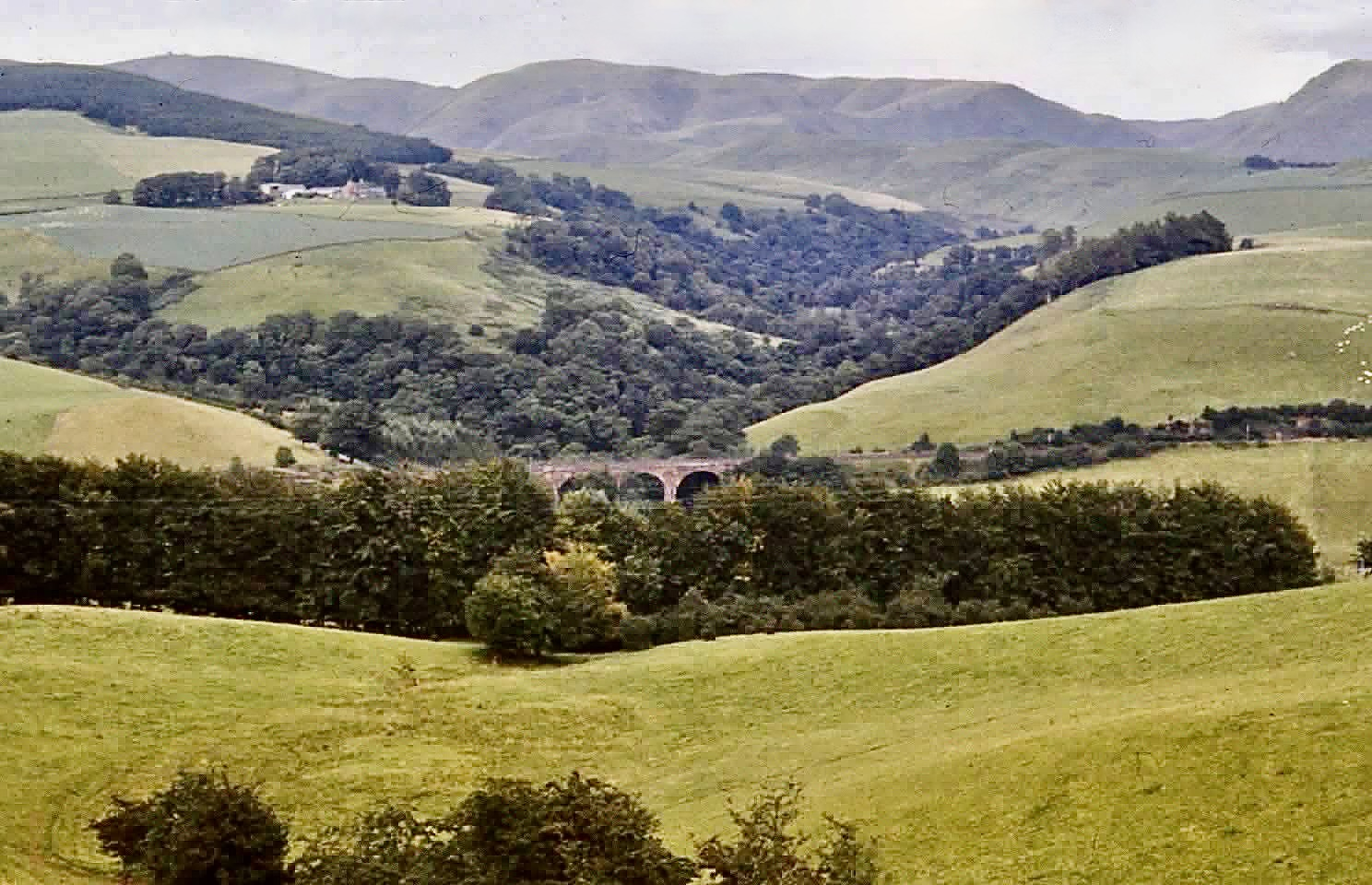
Enterkinfoot Viaduct and Black Hill in 1979

==== Enterkin Viaduct ====
The 111 ft (34 m)-high Enterkin Viaduct with its four arches runs above Enterkinfoot and a substantial retaining wall lies just to the north. The 219 ft (67 m) long viaduct, built of red ashlar by John Miller, has had a Category B listing since 26 June 1986.

==== Enterkinfoot retaining wall ====
The impressively engineered Enterkinfoot retaining wall (NS 8527 0482) is said to be a benchmark of its type, built by German engineers in around 1848 for the Glasgow, Dumfries and Carlisle Railway that opened in 1850 and became the Glasgow and South Western Railway. The design of this massive wall guarantees the stability of the double track railway above and in addition it prevents erosion of the embankment.

=== Etymology ===
The Enterkin Burn's name, with variants such as 'Inter' may originate in the Scots Gaelic 'eanach t'uircein' meaning 'sow's' or 't'arcoin' meaning 'mastiff's or blood hounds marsh'. 'Coshochel' is said to be of Brythonic rather than Gaelic origin, translating as the 'red height'. Hapland Farm may derive from the Scots language for the Curlew (Numenius arquata).

== Micro-history ==
In British usage Enterkinfoot is technically a hamlet rather than a village as it has always lacked a formal dedicated church of its own.

== See also ==
- Mennock Lye Goods Depot
- Mennock
