= Robert Burns's diamond point engravings =

Glass inscriptions by Scottish poet

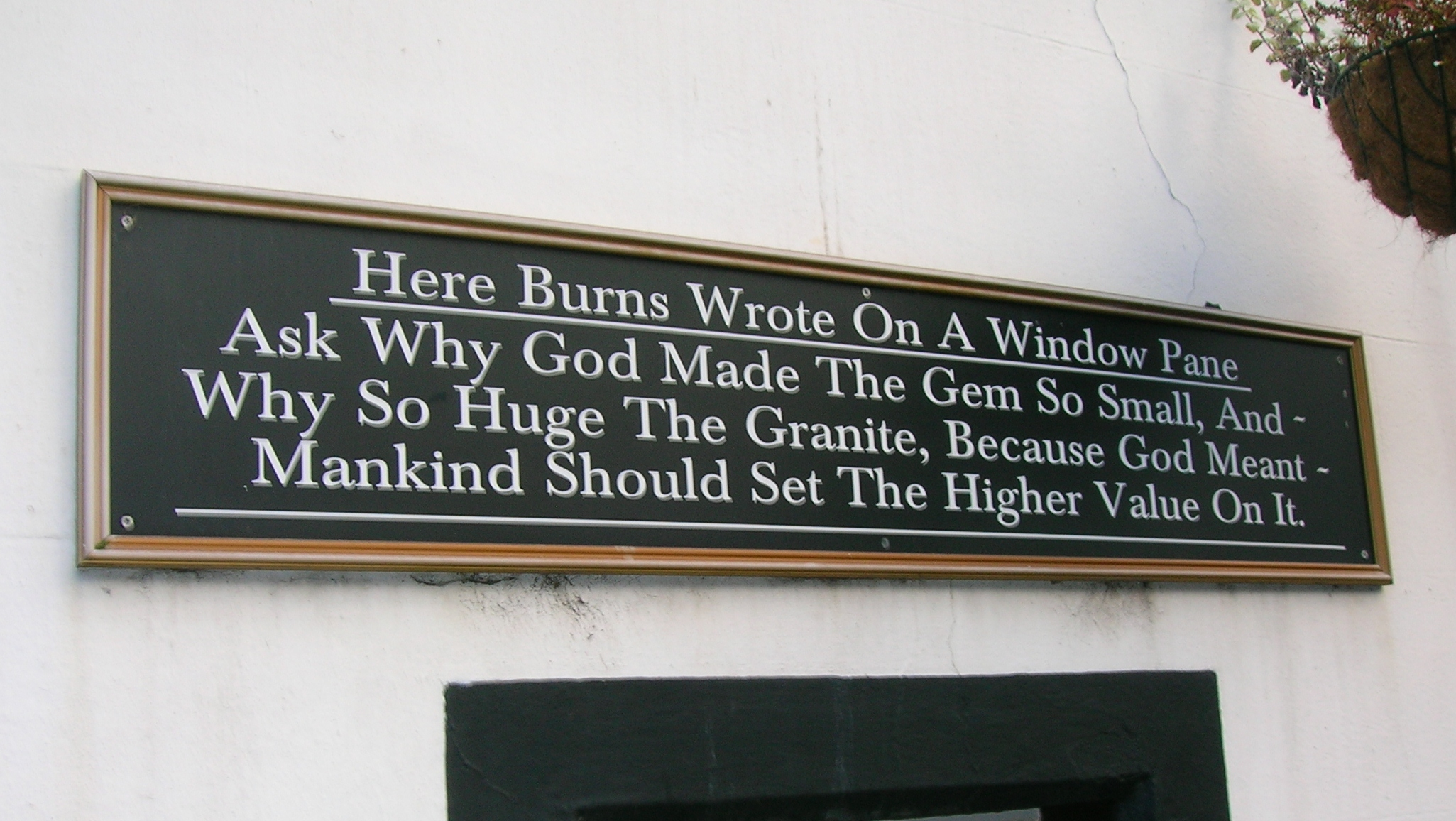
Inscription at the Black Bull Hotel, Moffat.

Robert Burns came to know James Cunninghamme, Earl of Glencairn in Edinburgh in 1786 through a 'Letter of Introduction' provided by Dalrymple of Orangefield who was married to Lady Glencairn's sister. The Earl received the poet warmly in his house and introduced him to his friends. One of several gifts from the earl to the poet was a diamond point pen, stylus, or cutter which he used to write upon many windowpanes and glasses, scribing verse, his signature, epigrams, or other writings for posterity. Many of these diamond-point engravings survive, some however are contentious as regards either their authenticity, meaning, or both.

== Burns's diamond point pen ==
The pen may well survive to this day, made of a cylindrical piece of wood (elder?), and has the diamond inserted at one end in a metal extension. It is held in the collection of the Rozelle House Galleries in South Ayrshire. Its Accession Number is AYRTOS:100346, The Digital Number is SABN001n. The original catalogue record for the object states that it is an "old glass cutting diamond used by Robert Burns". The pen is part of the collections from the former Tam O'Shanter Museum in Ayr, currently under the care of South Ayrshire Council (datum 2012).

== Diamond point ==
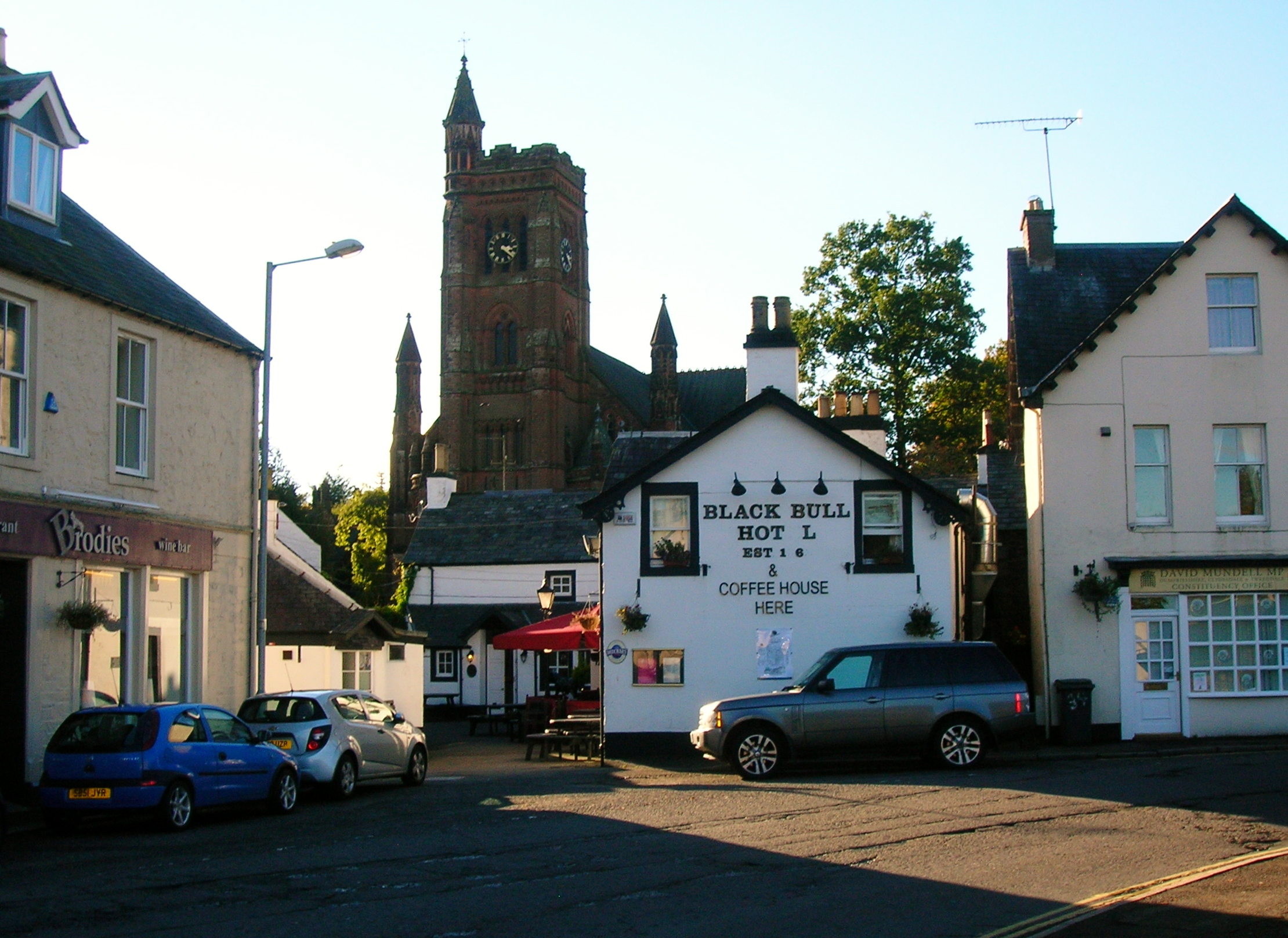
The Black Bull Inn.

This is one of the oldest glass engraving techniques, practiced by the ancient Romans probably using flint and in the mid-sixteenth century in England and Holland using diamond tipped tools and a stipple technique to produce landscapes, portraits, still life, etc. Old glass has a higher lead content than the present day and this generally made scribing easier and more fluid in its execution.

=== On windowpanes ===
==== 1. The Inn at Inverary ====
Burns paid a visit to the Duke of Argyll in June 1787, but was unfortunate in that the duke was busy with a large gathering of the British Fishery Society. John Frazer, the innkeeper, was too busy to attend to Burns. He wrote these lines on a window in the inn in the presence of his travelling companion Dr. George Grierson with his newly acquired diamond-point pen so it would be one of his first :

"Whoe'er he be that sojourns here,
I pity much his case.
Unless he comes to wait upon
The lord their god, His Grace

There's naething here but Highland pride,
And Highland scab and hunger;
If Providence has sent me here,
'Twas surely in an anger."

Three different versions of the verses have been published. The whereabouts of the windowpane and inscription are longer known. It was in the hands of the Argyll family for many years and then lent to an exhibition and never returned.

==== 2. Kirkliston, Edinburgh ====
Kirkliston is often given the nickname of "Cheesetown". One theory is that this because of an inscription mentioning cheese inscribed by Burns on a window pane of Castle House, formerly an inn. The window pane in question was put on show in the late 19th century at Broxburn in the Strathbock Inn. No satisfactory explanation has been given for Burns stopping here at the start of his Highland Tour and the poet himself has left no record of the event and the details of the whereabouts of the pane itself has been lost.

"The ants about their clod employ their care,
And think the business of the world is theirs;
Lo: Waxen combs seem palaces to bees.
And mites conceive the world to be a cheese. "

==== 3. Inver Inn, Dunkeld ====
In 1787 Robert Burns set out from Edinburgh on a Highland Tour. Local tradition has long held that Burns visited Niel Gow at Dunkeld and went with him to the Inver Inn where, on seeing and hearing an irate woman, the poet inscribed an epigram which he wrote then and there on the window with his diamond pen. The lines were not those of the poet, having been published some years before:

Ye gods, ye gave to me a wife, out of your grace and pleasure,
To be the partner of my life and I was glad to have her.
But if your providence divine for better things design her,
I obey your will at any time, I'm willing to resign her."

The non-existence of the windowpane with this inscription was explained away in the middle of last century, the glass was said to have been cut out for better preservation and was broken in the act.

==== 4. Carron Inn, Falkirk ====
In 1789 Robert Burns attempted to visit the Carron Ironworks at Camelon near Falkirk, however he was refused entry because it was a Sunday and the works were closed. The poet went to the nearby Carron Inn opposite and breakfasted on the second floor where he inscribed on a windowpane the following lines:

At Carron Ironworks

We cam here to view your warks,
In hopes to be mair wise,
But only, lest we gang to hell,
It may be nae surprise:

But when we tirl'd at your door,
Your porter dought na hear us;
Sae may, shou'd we to Hell's yetts come,
Your billy Satan sair us!

William Benson, a clerk at Carron Works (from 1765), saw these lines and copied into an order book. He penned a reply:

If you came here to view our works,
You should have been more civil,
Than to give a fictitious name,
In hopes to cheat the devil,

Six days a week to you and all,
We think it very well;
The other if you go to church,
May keep you out of hell.

These verses were published in the 5 October 1789 edition of the Edinburgh Evening Courant and inscription survived until the window was blown in on a stormy night.

==== 5. Wee Bush Inn, Carnwath ====
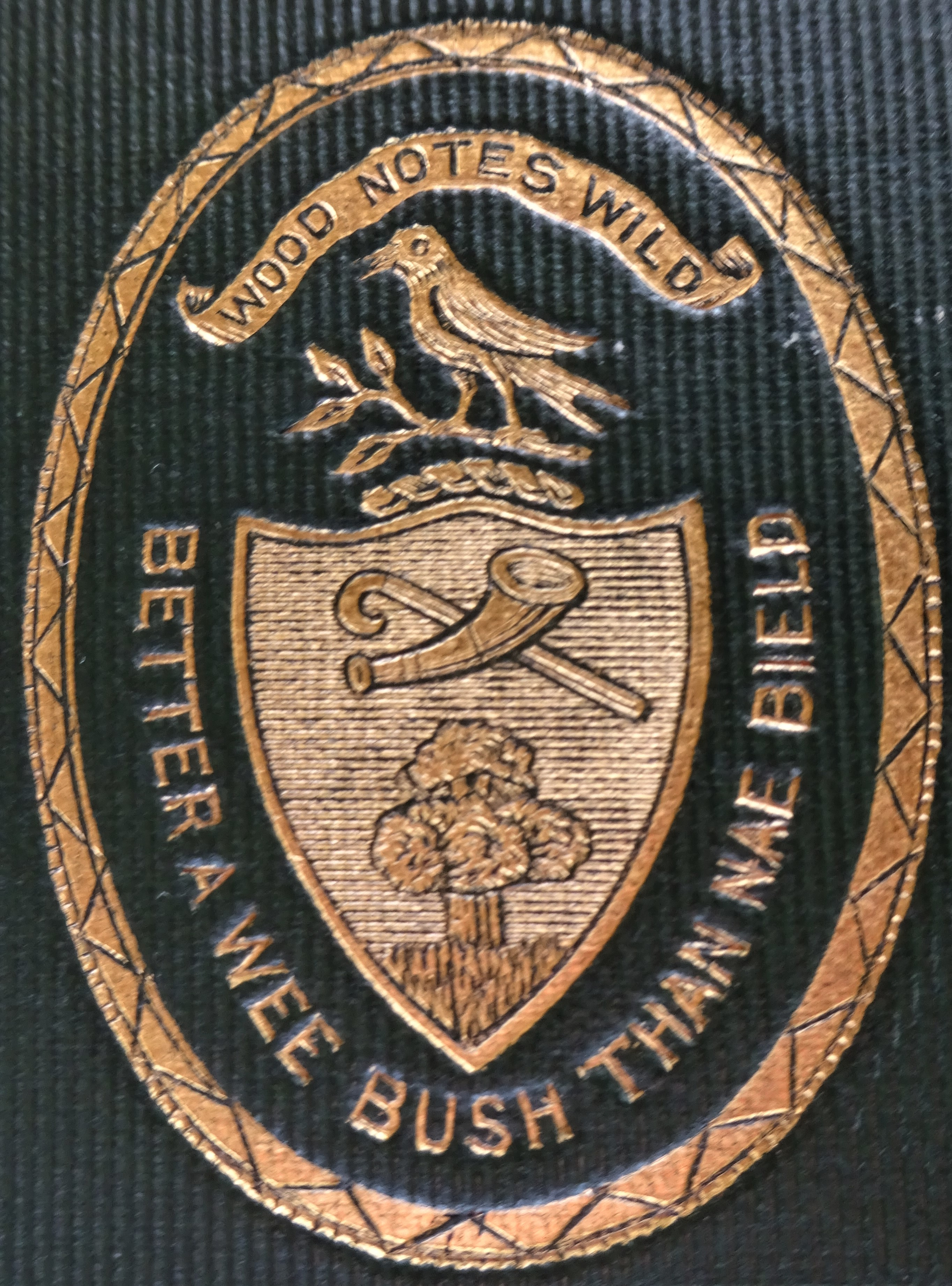
Robert Burns's coat of arms.

Opened in 1750, Burns stayed here and also used to drop in on his journeys to Edinburgh, for Carnwath was where he would pick up the old coach road to the capital, known as the 'Lang Whang'. He is said to have been asked his opinion on the hostelry and wrote on a window pane "Better a Wee Bush than Nae Bield." This was also a motto that he added to his coat of arms. It is not recorded as to what happened to the inscribed pane of glass.

==== 6. Cross Keys Inn, Falkirk ====
In 1787 Burns toured the Highlands with Willie Nicol as a companion and visited Falkirk en route where he is said to have inscribed a glass window pane of the Cross Keys Inn with 4 lines beginning – 'Sound be his sleep and blithe his morn'; dated 25 August 1787.

Sound be his sleep and blythe his morn',
That never did a lassie wrong;
Who poverty ne'er held in scorn,
For misery ever tholed a pang.
25th Aug. 1787

The bard is not known to have acknowledged these lines, however local tradition is strongly supportive of the story. The owners took the glass pane with them to Sydney in Australia. Although it was thought to be lost it is now on display in the Robert Burns Birthplace Museum in Alloway. A signature, said to be by Robert Burns was uncovered on a glass partition and subsequently purchased for a princely sum, but is now lost.

==== 7. Ecclefechan ====
Burns in February 1795 is said to have been held up in an inn at Ecclefechan during a snowstorm and encountered Jean Scott, the daughter of the postmaster John Scott. Burns engraved the lines of "Epigram on miss Jean Scott" on a window pane.

O had each Scot of ancient times
Been, Jeanie Scott, as thou art;
The bravest heart on English ground
Had yielded like a coward.

==== 8. Braehead House, Kilmarnock ====
This was the home of William Paterson, the Town Clerk. Burns was an occasional visitor and apparently in a melancholic mood he engraved two lines from a poem by John Dryden. The complete window frame and engraved lines are recorded to have been preserved at the Dick Institute in Kilmarnock.

==== 9. Finlaystone House ====
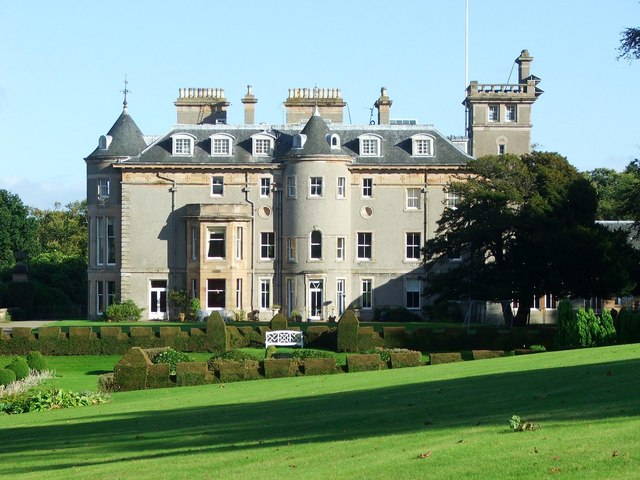
Finlaystone House.

Burns's signature is said to exist on a windowpane in an upstairs bedroom at Finlaystone, home of James Cunningham, Earl of Glencairn. Mason records that Robert Burns left his initials on a window pane in the library. Gibb records the message written as:

R. Burns,1768.
Under an aged oak,
AMEN,

This was inscribed on a window pane in a first floor bedroom, which was at that time was a drawing room. The words refer to Burns drinking wine with the family and their guests under a large oak that still stood in the 1870s.

A photograph shows a broken pane with part of the name 'Robert' broken off and no 'Under an aged oak'. It is recorded to be associated with a bottle seal also dated 1768. Burns would have been nine years old in 1768 and it is suggested that this date makes reference to the wine's vintage being 1768, enjoyed by Burns and the earl in the 1780s.

==== 10. The Whitefoord Arms, Mauchline ====
Burns engraved 'sarcastic' lines about John Dow, Landlord of the Whitefoord Arms, on a window pane in the upper room of the inn which he had often used to communicate with Jean Armour whose home lay just across the street from the back of the building. It is not recorded how much of the poem was engraved. The room was preserved as it was in Burns time for the sake of tourists, however the pane was destroyed when the Whitefoord Arms was demolished at a date after 1881 when the author William Jolly saw it intact.

Here lies Johnie Pigeon:
What was his religion
Whae'er desires to ken
To some other warl'
Maun follow the carl,
For here Johnie Pigeon had nane!

Strong ale was ablution;
Small beer, persecution;
A dram was memento mori;
But a full flowing bowl
Was the saving his soul,
And port was celestial glory!

==== 11. Richard Brown's House, Bay Street, Port Glasgow ====
Richard Brown's granddaughter, Mrs Robert Montgomerie, is on record as stating that Robert Burns slept for one night in Brown's house on a journey from Greenock to Finlaystone House circa 1788 even though his friend Richard was at aea at the time. The family house in Bay Street was demolished at some point between 1960 and the end of the 1970s. The details of the inscription are not available and the pane was accidentally smashed. It had been the middle pane of the mid window in the dining room. Burns is said to have left behind a pair of hose which had been soaked in the rain.

==== 12. Cross Keys Hostelry, Greenock ====
Burns is said to have lodged on 24 June 1787 at this hostlery in Cross Shore Street, Greenock and the window pane upon which he inscribed some words was in the possession of a Mr George Williamson, a local historian and was inherited by his descendants.

==== 13. Drumlanrig Castle and Queensberry estates ====
From 1780 to 1797 James McMurdo was the chamberlain to the Duke of Queensberry and was a good friend of Robert Burns, who wrote a poem in tribute to McMurdo. Burns is recorded to have etched the following verse onto a window pane at McMurdo's dwelling on the estate.

On Mr McMurdo

Blest be McMurdo to his latest day!
No envious cloud o'ercast his evening ray;
No wrinkle furrow'd by the hand of care,
Nor ever sorrow add one silver hair!
O may no son the father's honour stain,
Nor ever daughter give the mother pain.

==== 14. Queensberry Arms (New Inn), Sanquhar ====
Burns was a frequent visitor to Sanquhar on account of his excise duties and he often stayed at the New Inn, later the Queensberry Arms, on the High Street where he is thought to engraved lines in 1789 on a windowpane in the breakfast room. Edward Whigham (1750–1823) was the innkeeper and later provost. The poem was not originally composed by Burns himself, but by John Hughes (1677–1720), before 1719, for a window in Wallington House, home of a Mrs Elizabeth Bridges. In the 1880s, the window pane was said to have been broken or removed during repairs to the house, but in the 1880s Miss Allison, a granddaughter of Edward, recited the lines from memory for the author of a local guidebook.

Envy, if thy jaundiced eye.
Through this window chance to pry,
To thy sorrow thou shalt find,
All that's generous, all that's kind
Friendship, virtue, every grace,
Dwelling in this happy place.

The lines are also preserved, with minor variation in wording, and not in Burns's hand, in the copy of Burns's Kilmarnock edition that he presented to Mrs. Whigham, now in Princeton University Library. In 1896, the window pane itself was reported to be part of the Burns memorabilia collection of Mr David Barker, and it is more recently said to be in New Zealand.

A second untitled poem is also said to have been engraved by Burns:-

Ye Gods ye gave to me a wife,
Out of grace and favour,
To be the comfort of my life,
And I was glad to have her.
But if your providence divine
For other ends design her
To obey your will at any time
I'm ready to resign her.

==== 15. Ellisland Farm ====
Robert apparently sent his brother-in-law Adam Armour at dead of night to Ellisland Farm in November 1791 to smash every window in the farm upon which he had inscribed verses by way of revenge upon James Morin, Laird of Laggan who was the new owner, paying him 5 shillings to carry out the task. Robert felt cheated over the price paid for a heap of manure, a valuable commodity before artificial fertilisers were available. No full record of the verses has survived. Adam Armour and Fanny Burnes's signatures were on a window pane in the southern window of the parlour as well as a favourite quote from Alexander Pope "An honest man's the noblest work of God." in what may have been Burns's handwriting.

Until March 1876, when it was vandalised, part of an apparently surviving window pane in a river view facing window had a diamond point pen inscription inscribed by Burns. This was especially valued as it could be seen from outside as well as from within.

McKay records that John Gillespie and Jean Lorimer's names were scratched on a windowpane as well as the Pope quote of "An honest man's the noblest work of God." He also states that it was vandalised with a piece of flint in March 1876.

In the 1810s, when Robert Carruthers was apprenticed to a Dumfries bookseller, one window at Ellisland was inscribed with many versions of Jean Armours initials and the slightly altered 'Pope' quote reading "An honest woman's the noblest work of man,” and that it was believed to have been etched on the window by Burns. The 1791 destruction may not therefore have been complete.

==== 16. Friars' Carse Hermitage ====
Amongst the most famous examples of scribing on windowpanes is at the Friars Carse Hermitage, near his then home at Ellisland Farm, which the poet was allowed to use by Robert Riddell as a place of peace and solitude where he could compose and write down his poems and songs.

Burns wrote the following lines on the Hermitage window to the memory of Robert Riddell:

Thou whom chance may hither lead,
Be thou clad in russet weed,
Be thou deckt in silken stole,
Grave these counsels on thy soul.

Life is but a day at most,
Sprung from night – in darkness lost;
Hope not sunshine ev'ry hour,
Fear not clouds will always lour.

The original windowpane was preserved and is now in the Ellisland Farm museum, having been removed by a new owner of the property and coming up for sale in 1835 it was purchased for five guineas. The restored Hermitage building's window had the same lines inscribed upon it, however they are now in the mansion house and the Hermitage's windows have no inscription. Friars' Carse at one time held the original Burns manuscripts The Whistle and Lines Written in the Hermitage.

The second window of the 1874 building had the following verse inscribed upon it that were written on the original pane by Burns when he visited Friars Carse for the last time, some years after Robert Riddell's death.

To Riddel, much lamented man,
This ivied cot was dear;
Reader, dost value matchless worth?
This ivied cot revere.

In 1888 the original windowpane was loaned by Thomas Nelson to the 'Scottish National Memorials' section of the Glasgow International Exhibition held in the reconstructed 'Bishop's Castle' in Glasgow.

==== 17. Globe Tavern, Dumfries ====
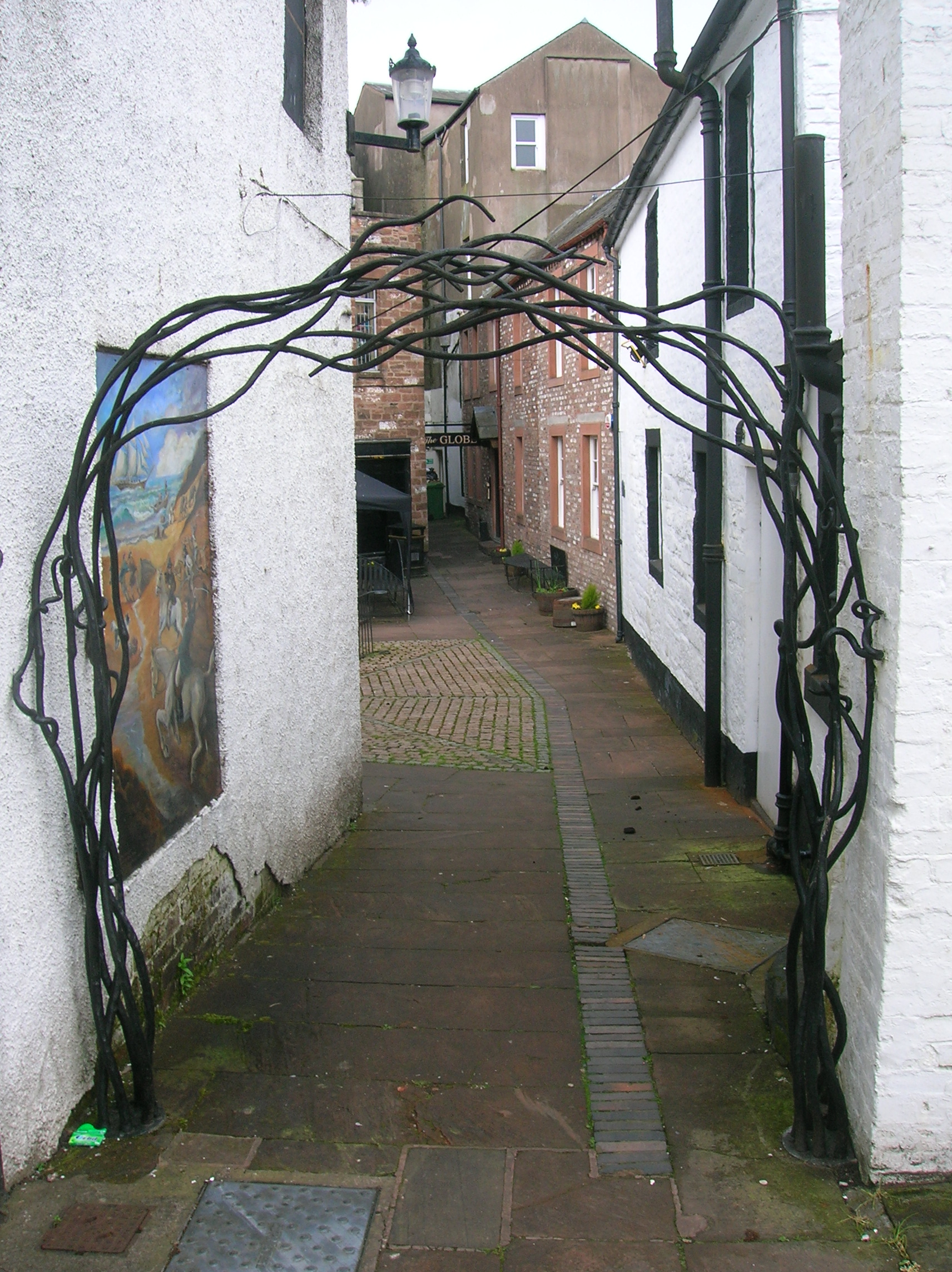
The Globe Inn.

At the Globe Inn, Dumfries, in an upstairs bedroom a number of windowpanes were inscribed, two genuine ones remaining. One pane has a stanza from "Lovely Polly Stewart." whilst the other has a variant on "Comin Thro the Rye."

Gin a body meet a body
Coming through the grain.
Gin a body kiss a body
The thing's a body's ain.

W. Scott Douglas records that yet another variant of this song was inscribed by Burns:

Gin a body kiss a body
Comin' through the grain.
Need a body grudge a body
What's a body's ain.

Three verses of "Lines Written on Windows of the Globe Tavern" were also present with at least the first stanza of "At the Globe Tavern."

The following stanza is said to have been written on one of the window panes after he was told by the Excise authorities that his duty "was to act, not to think":

In politics if thou would'st mix,
And mean thy fortunes be;
Bear this in mind, be deaf and blind, -
Let great folks hear and see.

The three missing panes were sold by the pub's owner in the 19th century and a later attempt to buy them back was not successful. Exact replicas of the missing lines have been put back in place in 2011. The original windowpanes are kept at the Burns Birthplace Museum at Alloway who do not wish to give them up.

James McKie records that Mrs Ewing, landlady of the 'Globe', presented a pane to Mr John Thomson of Lockerbie and that he later presented it in 1824 to Mr John Spiers of Glasgow. In 1874 this was in the possession of Mr. David Dunbar, author, of Dumfries. Mr William Nelson of Edinburgh at one time owned The Globe and the stanza on the pane was at that time from "Sae Flaxen were her Ringlets":

Her's are the willing chains of Love,
By conquering beauty's sovereign law;
But still my Chloris' dearest charm,
She says she loes me best of a'.

==== 18. King's Arms, Dumfries ====
This inn was used by Burns when he had business in the town and was of a somewhat 'aristocratic' nature. Burns inscribed these words on the window of the King's Arms Tavern, Dumfries, as a reply, or reproof, to some swells who had been witty and disrespectful about excisemen or gaugers:

Ye men of wit and wealth, why all this sneering,
Gainst poor Excisemen? give the cause a hearing;,
What are you, landlords' rent-rolls? teasing ledgers:,
What premiers—what? even monarchs' mighty gaugers:
Nay, what are priests, those seeming godly wise men?,
What are they, pray, but spiritual Excisemen?;

==== 19. Annan, Dumfrieshire ====
Burns lodged at Thomas Williamson's home whilst on excise duties and Miss Harkness, Williamson's granddaughter, recalled that he left inscriptions on some of the window panes.

==== 20. Gardenstoun Arms, Laurencekirk ====
On 11 Sept 1787 Burns stayed at the Gardenstoun Arms near Laurencekirk, then known as the 'Boars Head' with William Nicol. He is said to have written on a windowpane in his upstairs bedroom – "the lovely Miss Betsy Robinson, Banff, 27th December 1779". The windowpane was removed at some point prior to 1939 and was probably at that point broken into two. The windowpane was in the Meffan Institute for some years and was then taken by the Adam's family, previous owners of the business, to Canada. In 1977 the pane, broken into three, was presented to the Arbroath Public Library by Captain John B. Adam, however it remains the property of the Adam family. The Gardenstoun Arms has been demolished. The date on the inscription is however eight years after Burns's tour.

An Elizabeth Robinson of Banff, was born there on 27 May 1762 and married an Andrew Hay. She was painted by Raeburn. It unclear what connection Robert Burns may have had with her.

==== 21. Black Bull Inn, Moffat ====
The Black Bull Inn was first established in 1568. The pane of glass bearing the bard's verses are said to have been given to the Grand Duke Nicholas of Russia during a visit to Moffat in 1817. The young duke was on a triumphal tour of Britain as one of the victorious allies who had defeated Napoleon at the Battle of Waterloo. A replica of the windowpane now hangs in the 'Robert Burns Room' within the hostelry, placed there in 1996 by the Robert Burns World Federation.

A friend asked the poet why God made Miss Davies so little, and a lady who was with her, so large: before the ladies, who had just passed the window, were out of sight, the following answer was recorded on a pane of glass:

Ask why God made the gem so small, and
Why so huge the granite, because God meant
Mankind should set the higher value on it.

==== 22. Laight Farm, New Cumnock ====
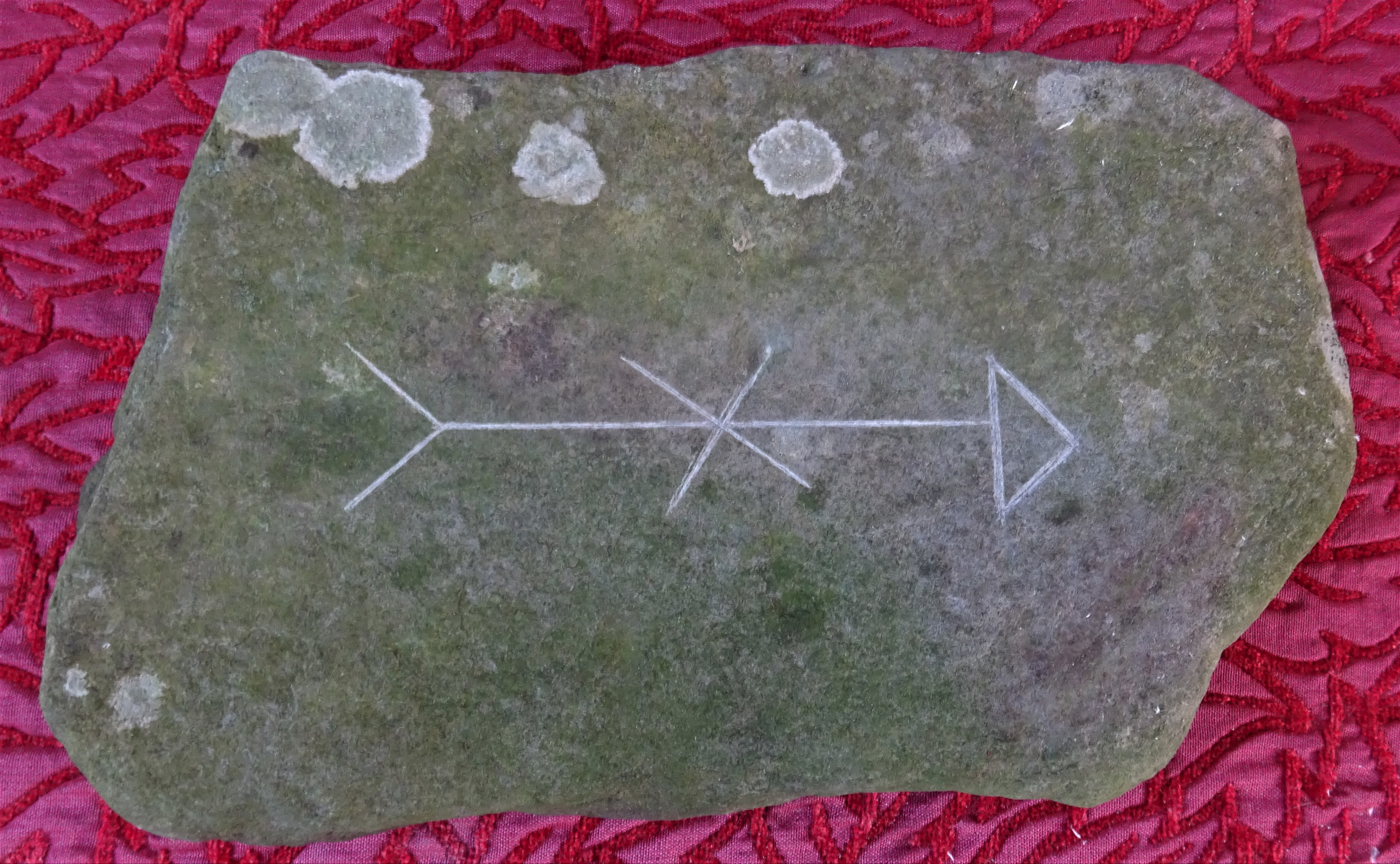
Burns's nine point star Masonic mark.

John Logan lived at Laight Farm and Burns visited on a number of occasions, dining here on Saturday 19 October 1788, and four days later dropping in for breakfast. He knew John through his Masonic links and John was very helpful in securing subscribers for copies of his first "Kilmarnock Edition" of his poems. A window in the west gable, to the right of the front door, locally known as the 'Burns Window' once carried inscriptions by Burns, removed in the 1970s and displayed for some years in the Crown Hotel. One inscription was Burns's Masonic mark, if present, making it the third known use of the symbol by the poet, another was 'S. Logan' for the eldest daughter, Sarah Logan. A third inscription in another hand was 'J.L', probably John Logan.

==== 23. St Margaret's Hill, Newmilns ====
The St Margaret's Hill was the Loudoun Manse, home at the time of the Reverend George Lawrie. Robert Burns was a frequent visitor, scribing the message on his bedroom windowpane there that said – "Lovely Mrs Lawrie, she is all charms". At one time the sadly broken windowpane was in the Dick Institute in Kilmarnock and later in the Barr Castle in Galston. The window sash and pane were for a time preserved in the modern Loudoun Manse and the inscription is regarded as genuine by handwriting experts. In 2024 the broken pane was restored and appeared on the Repair Shop TV programme. It was returned to the Barr Castle and its museum.

==== 24. Wingate's Inn, Stirling ====
James Macdonald recorded in his journal for 2 June 1796 that he had a dinner with Burns the evening previous at what is now known as the Golden Lion Hotel:

"I arrived here from Dumfries this evening, after a ride of about 30 miles in the most romantic country the mind can conceive. Yesterday Burns the Ayrshire Poet dined with me; and few evenings of my life passed away more to my satisfaction."

He looks consumptive, but was in excellent spirits, and displayed as much wit and humour in 3 hours time as any man I ever knew. He told me that being once in Stirling when we was a young lad, heated with drink, he had nigh got himself into a dreadful scrape by writing the following lines on the pane of a glass window at the inn –

Here Stewarts once in triumph reign'd,
And laws for Scotland's weal ordain'd;
But now unroof'd their Palace stands,
Their sceptre's fall'n to other hands;
Fall'n indeed unto the Earth.

Whence grovelling reptiles take their birth;
And since great Stewart's line is gone,
A race outlandish fills their throne;
An idiot race to honour lost,
Who know them best despise them most.

These lines were to almost cut short his career in the Excise before it had even started for he records in a letter that a "great person" had visited him and interrogated him "like a child about my matters, and blamed and schooled for my inscription on a Stirling window".

Possibly because of William Nicol's negative comments or the rebuke from a "great person" Burns later is said, only by Allan Cunningham, to have added the lines:

Rash mortal, and slanderous Poet! thy name,
Shall no longer appear in the records of fame,
Dost not know that old Mansfield, who writes like the Bible,
Says – the more 'tis a truth, sir, the more 'tis a libel?

It is said that he returned about two months later with Dr.Adair and smashed the pane with the head of a riding switch. The first set of lines are recorded in the Glenriddel manuscript.

Burns was too late in his attempt to remove the evidence as several travellers had copied the lines into their note books and it was widely circulated, in addition one John Maxwell, an eccentric Paisley poet had in 1788 published in the Stirling Times an article entitled "Animadversions on some Poets and Poetasters of the present age" in which he criticises Burns and Lapraik.

In 1828 a story appeared in the Paisley Magazine, edited by William Motherwill, to the effect that the 'Stirling Lines' had been written by William Nicol and that Burns took the blame upon himself to protect his friend. A manuscript in Burns's own hand however includes these lines and is given the title "Wrote by Somebody in an Inn at Stirling". Burns also admitted to Clarinda in 1788 that he had inscribed these lines.

==== 25. Brownhill Inn, Closeburn ====
The Brownhill Inn lay a couple of miles north of Ellisland Farm in the parish of Closeburn and was a favourite haunt of Burns from 1788 to 1791, even to the extent that he gave his own inscribed horn snuff mill to the landlord, Mr. Bacon. In the Ladies' Own Journal of 3 September 1870, published in Glasgow and Edinburgh, an article was published that claimed that Burns had engraved on some window panes certain verses that even best friends were ashamed of. The article claimed that Sir Charles D. Stuart-Menteith, Bart of Closeburn had these window panes carefully removed and packed away. Following his father's death Sir James is said to have examined these artefacts and was so shocked that he destroyed them in order to preserve Burns's reputation. Watson, a local man, records in 1901 that the poem concerned, written in 1788, was The Henpecked Husband:

"Curs'd be the man, the poorest wretch in life,
The crouching vassal to a tyrant wife!
Who has no will but by her high permission,
Who has not sixpence but in her possession;
Who must to he, his dear friend's secrets tell,
Who dreads a curtain lecture worse than hell.
Were such the wife had fallen to my part,
I'd break her spirit or I'd break her heart;
I'd charm her with the magic of a switch,
I'd kiss her maids, and kick the perverse bitch".

==== 26. High Street, Annan ====
Miss Harkness recalled that Burns left inscriptions by his diamond point pen on several windows on the upper floor of the property in the town's High Street where he often stayed whilst on Excise duties. The windows faced the street however no details of the inscriptions appear top have been recorded. In more recent times the building was the site of the Cafe Royal.

Burns composed this after Mrs Bacon, the landlords wife, locked up the bar one night and sent him to his bed, judging that her husband and the bard had consumed enough for that night. Mrs Bacon found the poem engraved on one of the window panes, the poet having engraved it that night or early the next morning. If it was this poem, then the destruction of the window panes was in vain, as it appears in all major collections of the poets works.

==== 27. A Small Country Inn, Dumfries ====
In 1803 the poem "On the Destruction of Drumlanrig Woods" was first published in The Scots Magazine and at first attributed to Burns who is said to have inscribed this lengthy work on a window pane. Henry Mackenzie later claimed to have composed it and its validity as a work by Burns is still debated. No manuscript version by Burns has been found.

Man! Cruel man!' the Genius sigh'd,
As through the cliffs he sank him down:
'The worm that gnawd my bonie trees
That reptile – wears a Ducal crown.'

==== 28. A Window Pane, Berwick-upon-Tweed ====
Burns considered Berwick an "idle town, but rudely pictureque,' suggesting criticism of the dirty streets he encountered. A local tradition in the town records that he engraved verses to this effect on a window pane in his lodgings, however he did not actually stay the night in the town, but he did dine there and that could have provided an opportunity. No manuscript version by Burns has been found of the supposed engraved verses. Four versions have been published:

Version 1

Berwick is a dirty place,
Has a church without a steeple,
A middenstead at every door,
And a damned deceitful people.'

Version 2

Berwick is an ancient town,
A church without a steeple,
A pretty girl at every door,
And very generous people.'

Version 3

Berwick is a dirty town,
A church without a steeple,
There's a midden at every door,
God curse all the people.'

Version 4

A bridge without a middle arch,
A church without a steeple,
A midden heap in every street,
And damned conceited people.'

==== Provenance unknown ====
National Museum of Scotland

The National Museum of Scotland holds a broken pane of glass which is said to have been inscribed by Robert Burns with the words:

I do compare her to the Damask Rose,
That in some well improven garden grows,
O if I was a bee,
To sip the heavenly balm upon her lips.

==== Totals from above ====
Surviving genuine glass windowpanes - 9; Lost genuine glass windowpanes - 10; Broken and lost genuine windowpanes - 6; Fake engraved windowpanes - 3; Fake and lost windowpanes - 11.

=== On drinking glasses ===
==== Jessie Lewars ====
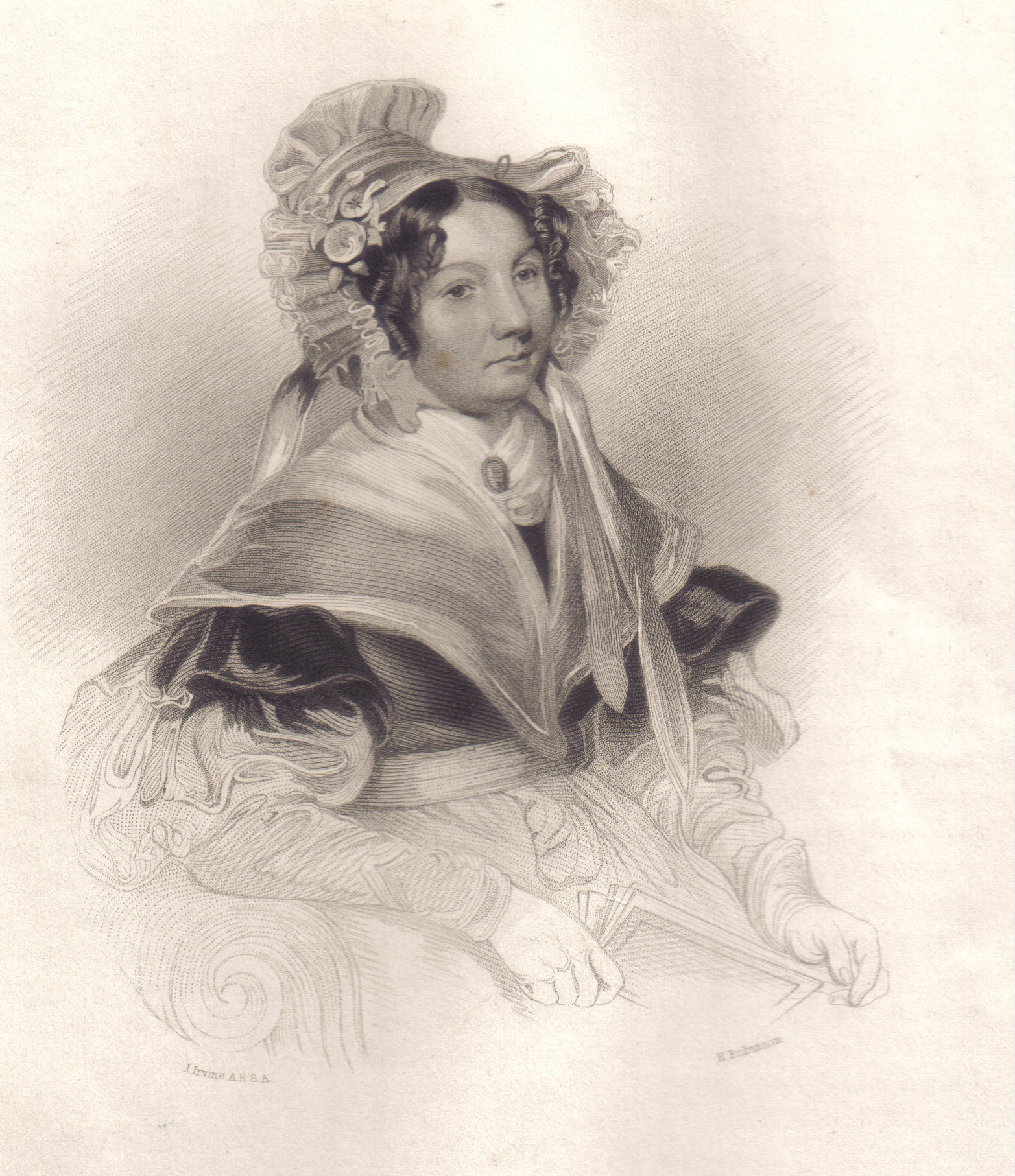
Jessie Lewars.

Jessie Lewars was a friend and neighbour of the Burns family in Dumfries who nursed Robert Burns during his last days. When she was briefly ill or indisposed Robert write an epitaph to her on a crystal goblet and asked her to retain it as a keepsake:-

Jessie's Illness

Say, sages, what's the charm on earth
Can turn Death's dart aside?
It is not purity and worth,
Else Jessie had not died!

Her Recovery
But rarely seen since Nature's birth
The natives of the sky!
Yet still one seraph's left on earth,
For Jessie did not die.

He also wrote a rhymed toast to her on another crystal goblet containing wine and water using his diamond pen. He had been ill and seemingly in slumber, he observed Jessy Lewars moving about the house with a light step lest she should disturb him. He presented the goblet to her.

The Toast

Fill me with the rosy wine;
Call a toast, a toast divine;
Give the Poet's darling flame;
Lovely Jessie be her name:
Then thou mayest freely boast
Thou hast given a peerless toast.

==== Willie Stewart ====
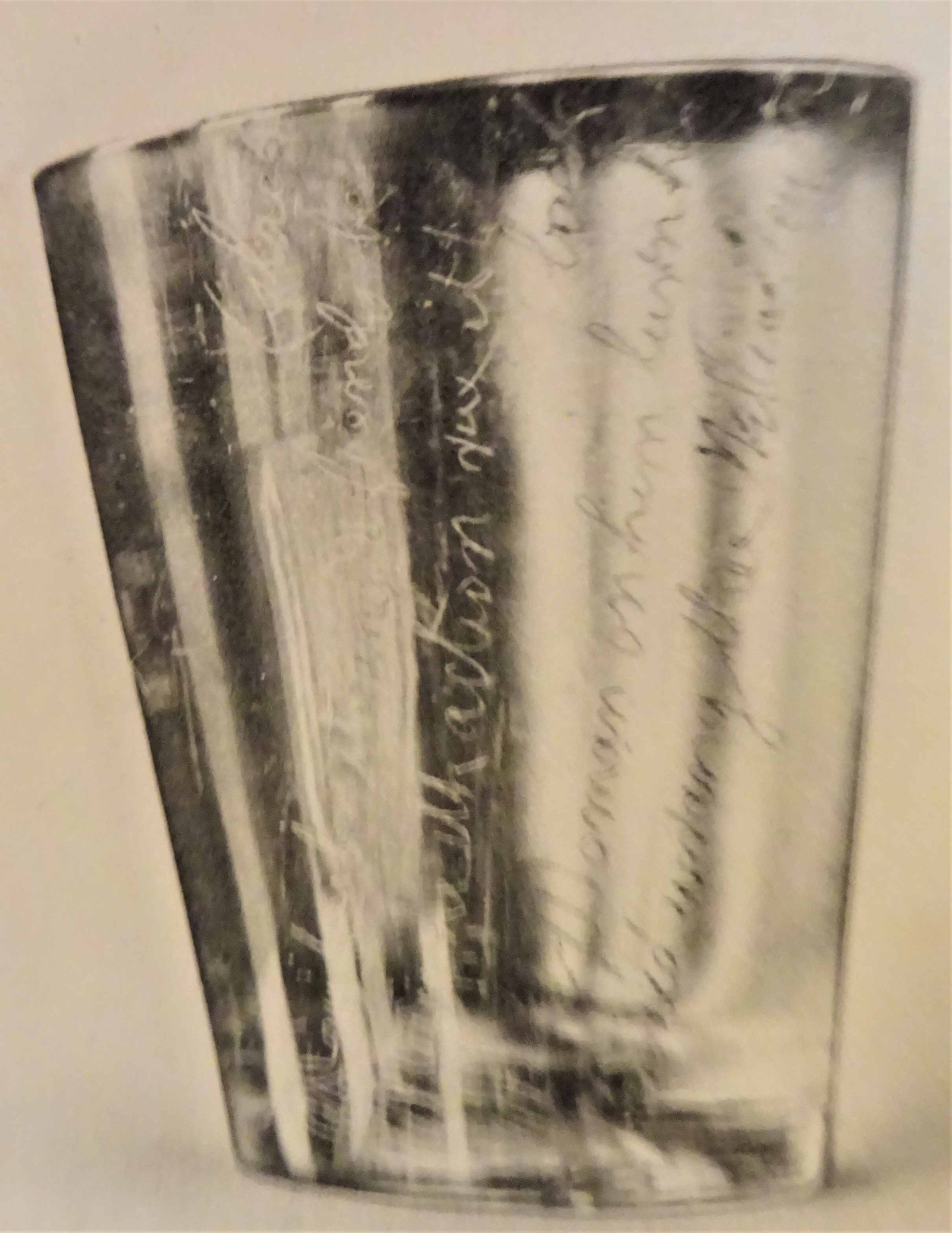
The Brownhill Inn engraved tumbler.

The 1791 dated poem "Your welcome, Willie Stewart" was scratched on a tumbler or tavern glass at the Brownhill Inn by the poet, much to the displeasure of the landlady, who sold the glass for a shilling to a customer who purchased it to soothe her anger. This tumbler was later acquired by Sir Walter Scott. Bearing in mind that Willie Stewart was the landlady's brother her behaviour seems a little excessive.

The son of an inn keeper at Closeburn Kirk Bridge, William Stewart (1749–1812), father of 'lovely Polly Stewart' was an acquaintance of Robert Burns who knew him as the factor of the Closeburn Estate of the Rev. James Stuart Menteith. The verses were written in honour of 'Polly Stewart'.

Chorus

You're welcome, Willie Stewart,
You're welcome, Willie Stewart,
There's ne'er a flower that blooms in May,
That's half sae welcome's thou art!

Come, bumpers high, express your joy,
The bowl we maun renew it,
The tappet hen, gae bring her ben,
To welcome Willie Stewart, &c.

May foes be strang, and friends be slack,
Ilk action, may he rue it,
May woman on him turn her back,
That wrangs thee, Willie Stewart,
You're welcome, Willie Stewart, &c.

=== Inscription on Goblets ===
Written on a dinner-goblet by Robert Burns at Ryedale, John Syme's home in Troqueer parish. Syme, annoyed at having his set of crystal goblets defaced, threw the goblet under the fire grate: it was taken however taken by his clerk, and preserved as a curiosity.

There's death in the cupsae beware!
Nay, morethere is danger in touching;
But wha can avoid the fell snare?
The man and his wine's sae bewitching!

The text was adapted by Burns from the Bible, the Second Book of Kings, iv, 40.

Burns's friend Gabriel Richardson owned a brewery which Burns as an excise office had to survey. Gabriel was the father of Sir John Richardson, the Arctic explorer. His mother passed the tumbler on to her son and in 1881 it was in the possession of his widow, Lady Rchardson, at Lancrigg, Cumbria. He wrote on a glass goblet:

Here brewer Gabriel's fire's extinct,
And empty all his barrels:
He's blest-if as he brewe'd, he drink,
In upright, honest Morals.

== Contemporary works ==
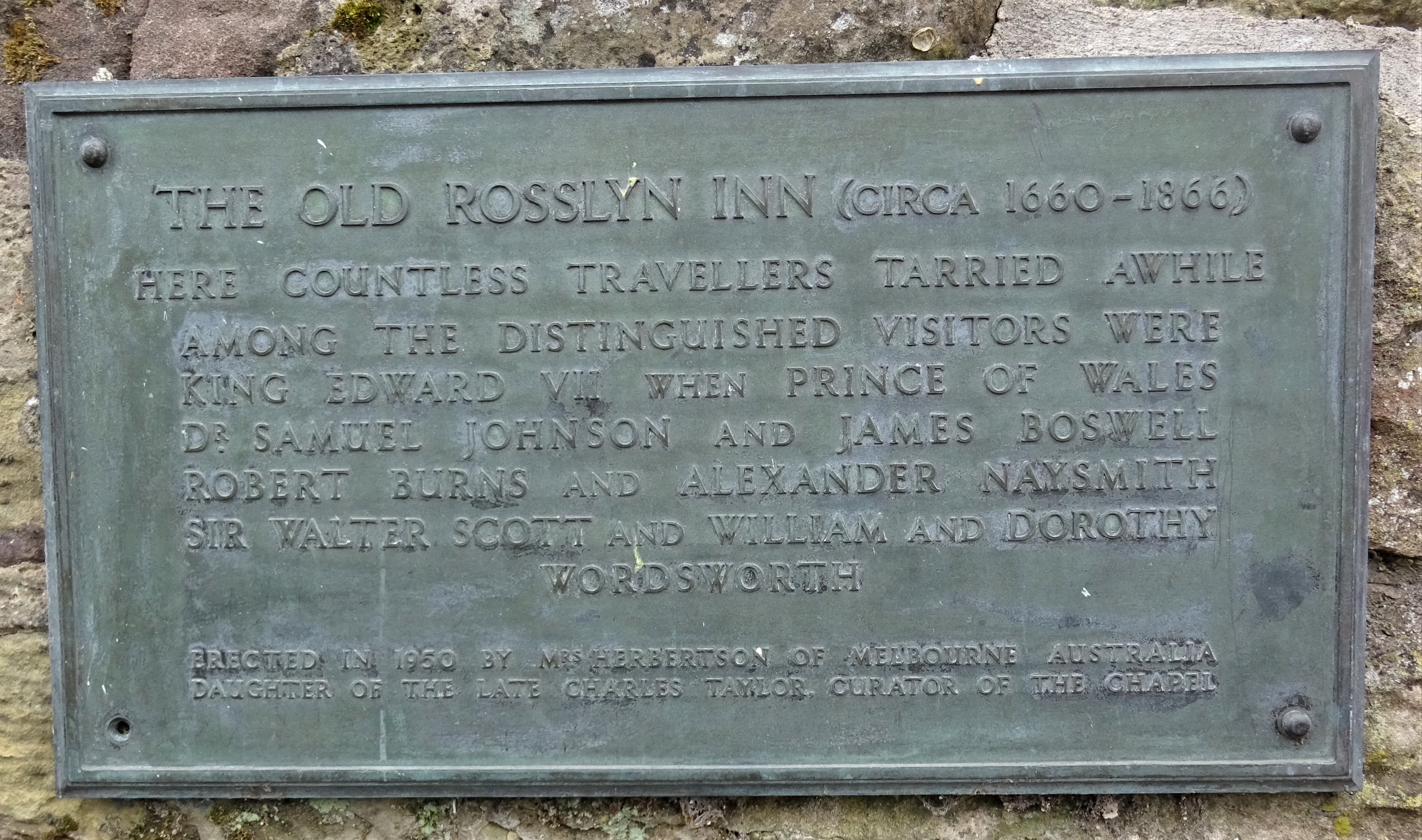
Plaque recording the visit to the Rosslyn Inn by Robert Burns and Alexander Nasmyth

The Burns Windows Project was inspired by Robert Burns's habit of scribing verses on windowpanes. The artist Hugh Bryden and David Borthwick, lecturer at the University of Glasgow in Dumfries, came up with the idea of sending clear plastic sheets with a pen to contemporary poets and inviting them to submit their own work for display as window poems. The remit was "to write a poem which spoke of their own time 'in a transparent way."

== Other carvings, engravings and writings ==
In 1777 Burns is said to have visited the famous Crookston Yew Tree or "Queen Mary's Tree" and carved "Robt Burns Ap 4th, 1777" in the bark of the tree's trunk. In 1817 the tree was felled and taken to Pollok House where the section in question was preserved as a valuable relic. In December 1875 it was loaned for a time to the Paisley Burns Society by Sir William Stirling Maxwell, Bart. An ornate 'Dinner Hammer' made from the same tree was donated to the club by Sir William.

In 1789 Burns is said to have visited the New Inn at Kirkcaldy and left the following lines in pencil on the shutters of a window:

Stopp'd at this house, and, as I'm a sinner,
They've charg'd me eighteen-pence for dinner;
But, should I come again this road,
I'll not dine here - so help me, God!

Burns is said to have written a lengthy poem on a marble sideboard in the Hermitage belonging to the Duke of Athol in the wood of Aberfeldy. An excerpt:

WHOE'ER thou art, these lines now reading,
Think not, though from the world receding,
I join my lonely days to lead in
This desert drear,
That with remorse a conscience bleeding
Hath led me here.

The Innerpeffray Library holds a copy of the 'Kilmarnock Edition' which had once belonged to Andrew Crawford of Dalry in North Ayrshire. The owner had, circa 1826, copied the verses of 'Rough Roads' into this volume with the comment that Burns had written these lines with a pencil on a window shutter at a Stewarton inn:

I'm now arriv'd -- thanks to the Gods!
Through pathways, rough and muddy,
A certain sign that makin roads
Is no this people's study:
Altho' I'm not wi' Scripture cram'd,
I'm sure the Bible says
That heedless sinners should be damn'd,
Unless they men their ways.

Burns wrote lines on a Bank of Scotland bank note that belonged to James F. Gracie and dated 1 March 1780:

WAE worth thy power, thous cursed leaf!
Fell source of a' my woe and grief!
For lack o' thee I've lost my lass;
For lack o' thee I scrimp my glass.
I see the children of affliction
Unaided, thro' thy curs'd restriction.
I've seen the oppressors cruel smile,
etc.

In 1786 Burns visited Rosslyn Castle with the artist Alexander Nasmyth and they had breakfast at the Rosslyn Inn. Burns wrote an epigram on a pewter plate in appreciation of his excellent meal:

My blessings on ye, honest wife!
I ne’er was here before;
Ye’ve wealth o' gear for spoon and knife-
Heart could not wish for more.
Heav’n keep you clear o' sturt and strife,
Till far ayont fourscore,
And while I toddle on thro' life,
I’ll ne’er gae by your door!

Whilst at Taymouth Robert Burns wrote a few lines of poetry with a pencil on the whitewashed wall above the fireplace in the parlour at the Inn at Kenmore:

Poetic ardours in my bossom swell,
Lone wand'ring by the hermit's mossy cell;
The sweeping theatre of hanging woods,
The incessant roar of headlong tumbling floods.

This is thought to have been composed in recollection of his visit to the Falls of Acharn.

A landlord of a respectable Dumfries inn had the nickname The Marquis and oddly asked the bard to write on his skin. Burns apparently wrote :

Here lies a mock Marquis whose titles were shamm'd
If ever he rise, it will be to be dammed

Robert Burns is said to have carved his initials on a natural red sandstone arch in Crichope Linn near Thornhill, Dumfries and Galloway. His initials 'RB' are to be found in the Mauchline gorge near Ballochmyle Viaduct and are again said to have been carved by the poet who frequented the site and lived for a time at the nearby Mossgiel Farm.

Burns has been credited with writing on a window pane at Chester in 1798, though this would have been two years after he died and in a place he had never visited.
