= Brownhill Inn =

Building in Dumfries and Galloway, Scotland

Coordinates: 55.201796°N 3.725779°W

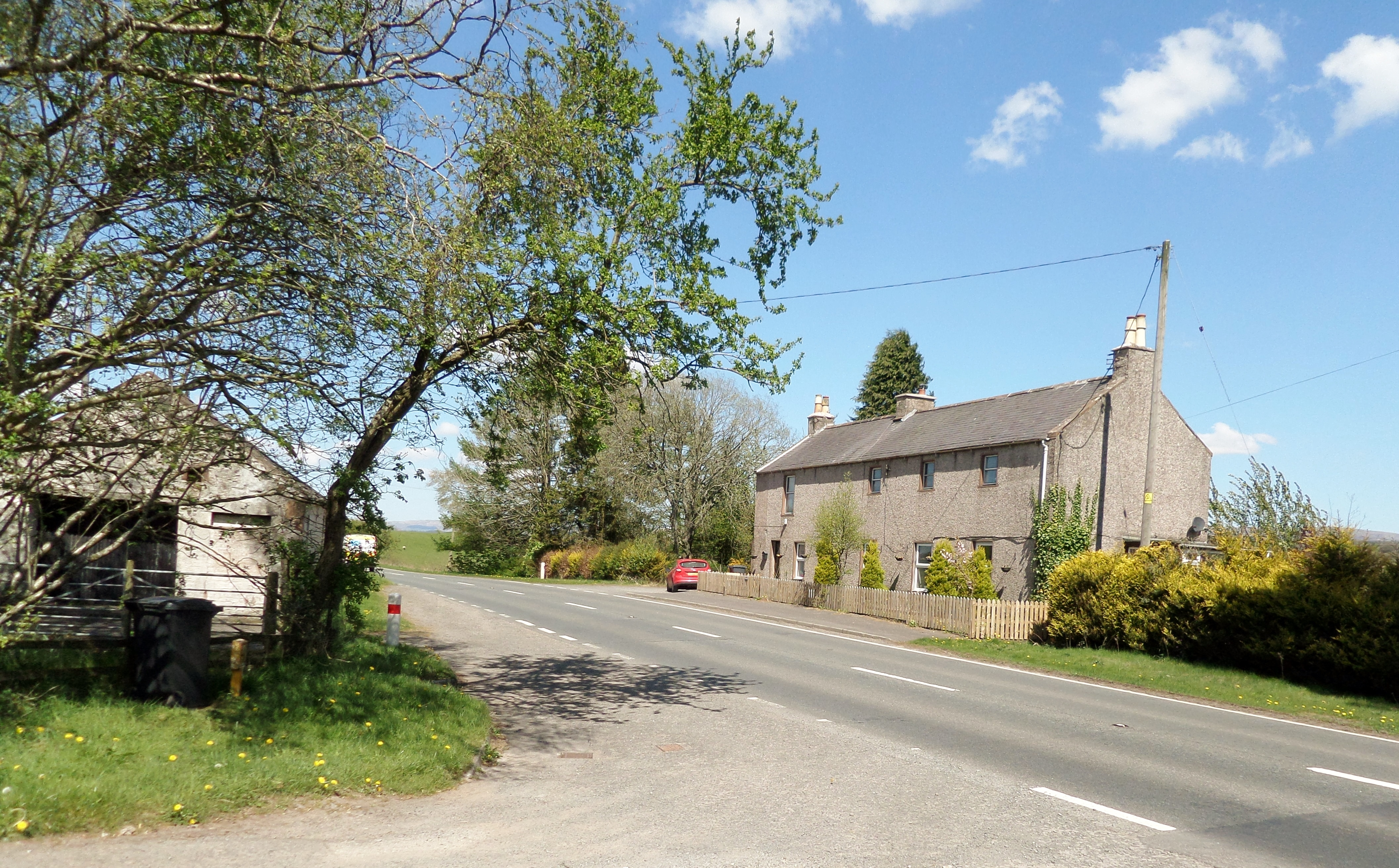
The site of the inn and the stables

Brownhill Inn, now just called Brownhill (NX 902 911), was an inn approximately 1 mile (1.6 km) mile south of Closeburn, on the A76, which itself is about 2 miles (3.2 km) south of Thornhill, in Dumfries and Galloway, Scotland. Built in approximately 1790, this old coaching inn has undergone extensive changes, and the south side of the original property appears little changed whilst part of the inn has been demolished. The inns facilities used to include the once-extensive 12 stall livery stables on the west side of the road, but these have been sold and converted to farm buildings after the inn closed. The inn was the first changing place for horses hauling coaches from Dumfries and closed in 1850. In 1789 an Act of Parliament had been passed that enabled the building of a Turnpike from Auldgirth Bridge to Sanquhar through Closeburn Parish and the inn was built to serve the patrons of this new road. The toll road supplanted the original post road that ran via Stepends, Gateside and Shaw that may have been of Roman origins.

== Robert Burns ==
Robert Burns referred to it as 'his local' and spent many an evening at the inn, which lies about 7 miles north of his once time home, Ellisland Farm. The landlord at the time, Mr John Bacon, took a keen interest in the poet and even bought the bed from Gilbert Burns at nearby Dinning Farm in 1798 that Burns was born in and installed it at Brownhill, charging people to see it. His groom, Joe Langhorne, slept in it for many years and in 1829 purchased it himself. He took it to Dumfries where the bed was eventually broken up by a relative and used to make snuff boxes that bore a commemorative inscription.

Burns was present at the stables when a clergyman took his horse from the hostler, without handing him the usual tip. When Burns received his horse, he put a sixpence into the poor man's "loof," at the same time ejaculating with reference to the minister's meanness:

"Black's your coat,
An' black's your hair,
Black's your conscience,
An' nocht tae spare."

The Ayrshire Monthly Newsletter of 1844 reported that "At the sale of the effects of Mr Bacon, Brownhill Inn, after his death in 1825, his snuff-box, being found to bear the inscription: Robert Burns - Officer of the Excise - although only a horn mounted with silver, brought £5. It was understood to have been presented by Burns to John Bacon, with whom he had spent many a merry night."

When asked on one occasion by a commercial traveller, surnamed Ladyman, to prove that it was really him that he was dining on bacon and beans with, Burns made up on the spot the following verse that highlighted the habit of the landlord to sometimes overstay his welcome:

"At Brownhill we always get dainty good cheer,
And plenty of bacon each day in the year;
We've a'thing that's nice, and mostly in season,
But why always Bacon — Come, tell me the reason?"

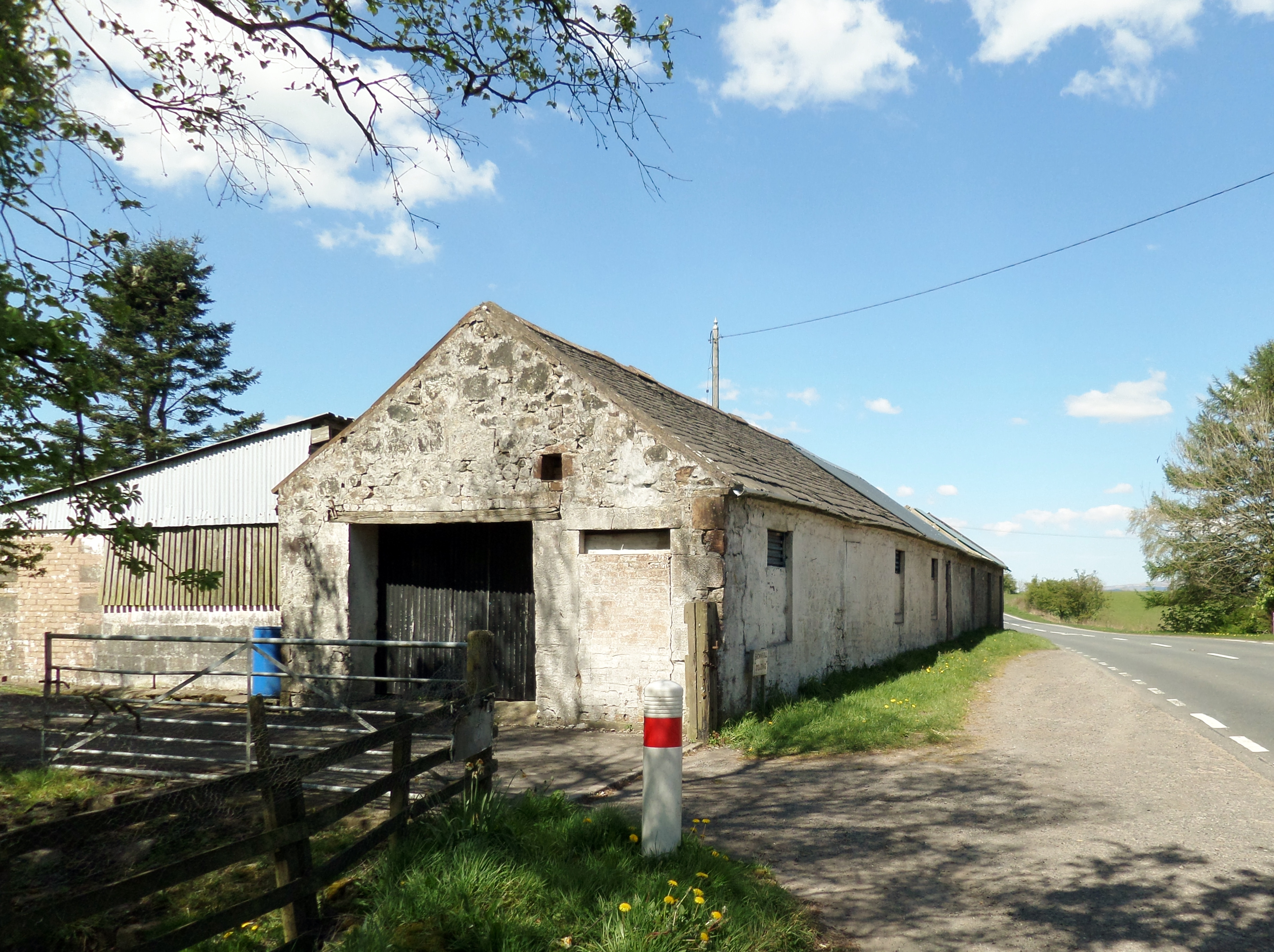
A view of the old livery stables looking north.

Alexander Pope's 'Song by a Person of Quality' was traditionally said to have been read out to Burns at Brownhill by a friend who went on to suggest that it was of a standard that was beyond his abilities, stating that 'The muse of Kyle cannot match the muse of London City'. Burns took the paper and after a moments thought composed and recited 'Delia - An Ode' that was published in one of two the London Star newspares of 1789. Recent research suggests that Burns was most probably not the author of 'Delia', casting considerable doubt on the whole incident.

One summer evening in 1793 whilst at the inn with Dr Purdie of Sanquhar and another friend, Burns met a weary soldier and upon listening to his story of the adventures he had lived through was inspired to write his famous song "The Soldier's Return"

His other recorded pursuits at the inn included annoying the landlord's wife by engraving a glass tumbler that became part of Sir Walter Scott's collections and also engraving window panes with his diamond point pen (the lines on the panes were so crude or inappropriate that they were carefully removed by then laird of Closeburn upon the poet's death, but later destroyed by his son to save the poet's reputation).

It is also recorded that 'One Monday even' he sent a rhymed epistle to William Stewart, beginning :

"In honest Bacon's ingle-neuk,
Here maun I sit and think;
Sick o' the warld and warld's fock,
And sick, d-amn'd sick o' drink!"

William Stewart was the father of "lovely Polly Stewart", and the brother-in-law to Mr Bacon the Landlord.

In 1788 Catherine Stewart (Mrs Bacon) inspired Burns to compose the poem "The Henpecked Husband" upon refusing to serve her husband and the poet with more liquor when they were engaged in a drinking bout at Brownhill.

"Curs'd be the man, the poorest wretch in life,
The crouching vassal to a tyrant wife!
Who has no will but by her high permission,
Who has not sixpence but in her possession;
Who must to he, his dear friend's secrets tell,
Who dreads a curtain lecture worse than hell.
Were such the wife had fallen to my part,
I'd break her spirit or I'd break her heart;
I'd charm her with the magic of a switch,
I'd kiss her maids, and kick the perverse bitch".

Burns frequently met Christina or Kirsty Kirkpatrick, cousin of Sir Thomas of that Ilk, at Brownhill Inn. She lived in Closeburn and was an excellent singer who assisted him by singing his songs in his presence, enabling him to alter the words to better fit the music.

William Grierson

William Grierson JP of Boatford was instrumental in the project that resulted in the building of the Burns Mausoleum in Dumfries, assisted by John Syme, a personal friend of Burns, and others. In his diaries he records several visits to the Brownhill Inn for breakfast, lunch, etc. He was for many years the secretary of the Dumfries Burns Club.

== Other famous faces ==
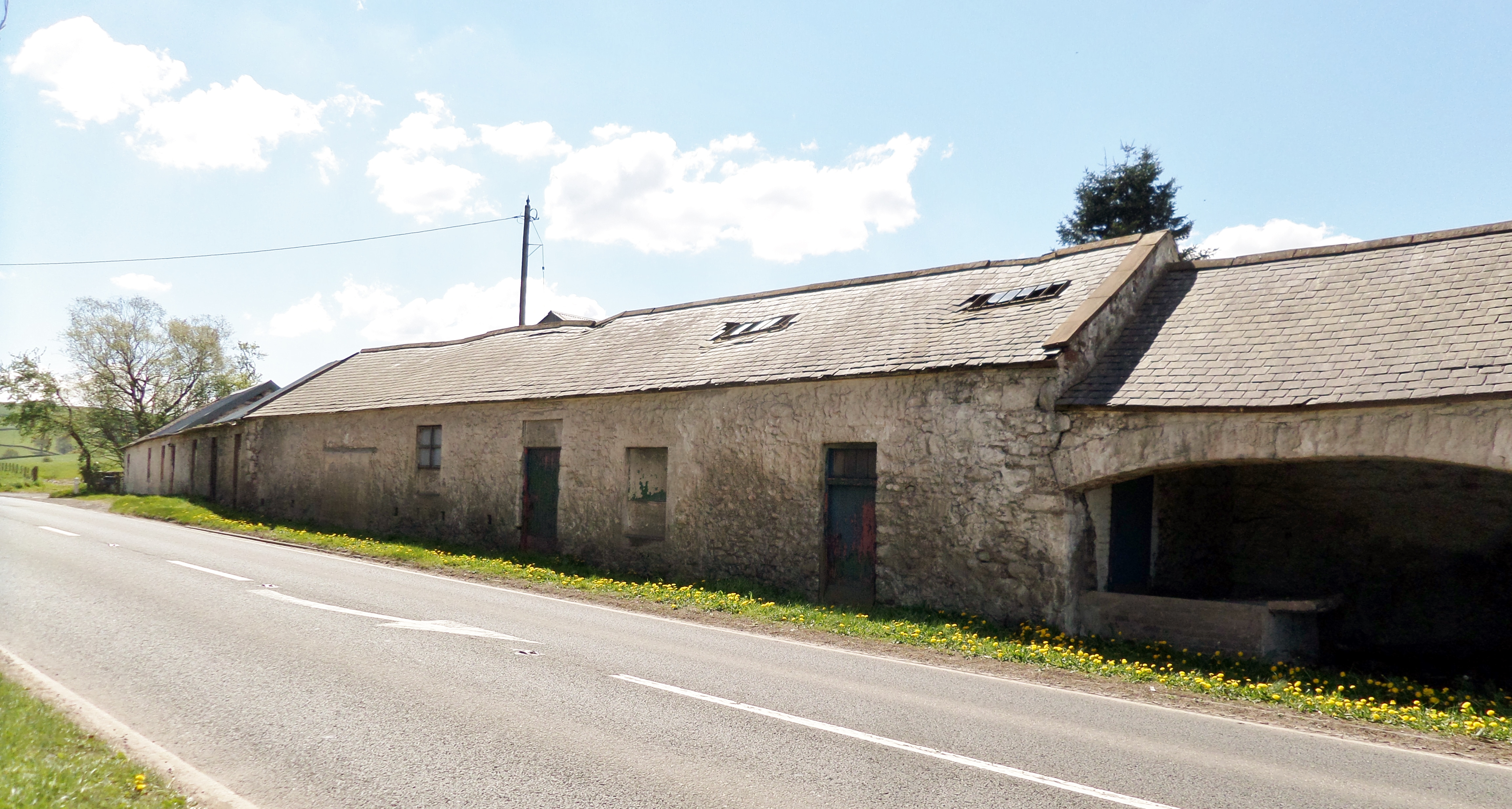
The site of the old coach house, stables, etc.

As well as Robert Burns, other famous poets also stayed at the inn. It is noted in Dorothy Wordsworth's diary, that she, her brother William and Samuel Coleridge also stayed here during their tour of Scotland. However it seems that she was not quite as taken with the inn as Burns, writing "It was as pretty a room as a thoroughly dirty one could be a square parlour painted green, but so covered over with smoke and dirt that it looked not unlike green seen through black gauze." She also commented on the lack of tree although she was impressed by the quantity of corn in the fields.

In October 1789 Elizabeth Boyle and her children John and Elizabeth journeyed to Bath via Brownhill. Elizabeth was the wife of the Hon. Patrick Boyle of Shewalton. The notes on their journey record that they stopped at Brownhill where they ate sandwiches at 'Menteaths house'. This may refer to the landlord of the Brownhill Inn that was built at around this time.

== The Free Church ==
The Rev. Patrick Barrowman of Glencairn was first 'Free Church' minister in the area following 'The Great Disruption' of 1843 in which 450 evangelical ministers of the Church broke away in a dispute over the issue of the Church's relationship with the State. The congregation at first had no place of worship however over the winter of 1843-4 the landlord of Brownhill Inn allowed them to use a large stable of twelve stalls and after cleaning and whitewashing it formed a most acceptable temporary church. In the summer months they made use of the stack yard and even carried out baptisms there. Sir James Menteth stepped forward with an offer of land and the congregation had built their own church by the end of 1844.

== Recent history ==
In more recent times, the property has served as a farm, including cheesemaking and, according to local lore, a courthouse and hotel. It is now a private family home and photography studio.

== Micro-history ==
On 2 November 1860 Mary Kellock, wife of Robert Wightman, died at Brownhill aged 77 years and was buried in Dalgarnock.

== See also ==
- Dunscore Old Kirk
- Ellisland Farm, Dumfries
- Friar's Carse
- The Hermitage (Friars Carse)
- Robert Burns' diamond point engravings
