= The Hermitage, Friars Carse =

The Hermitage
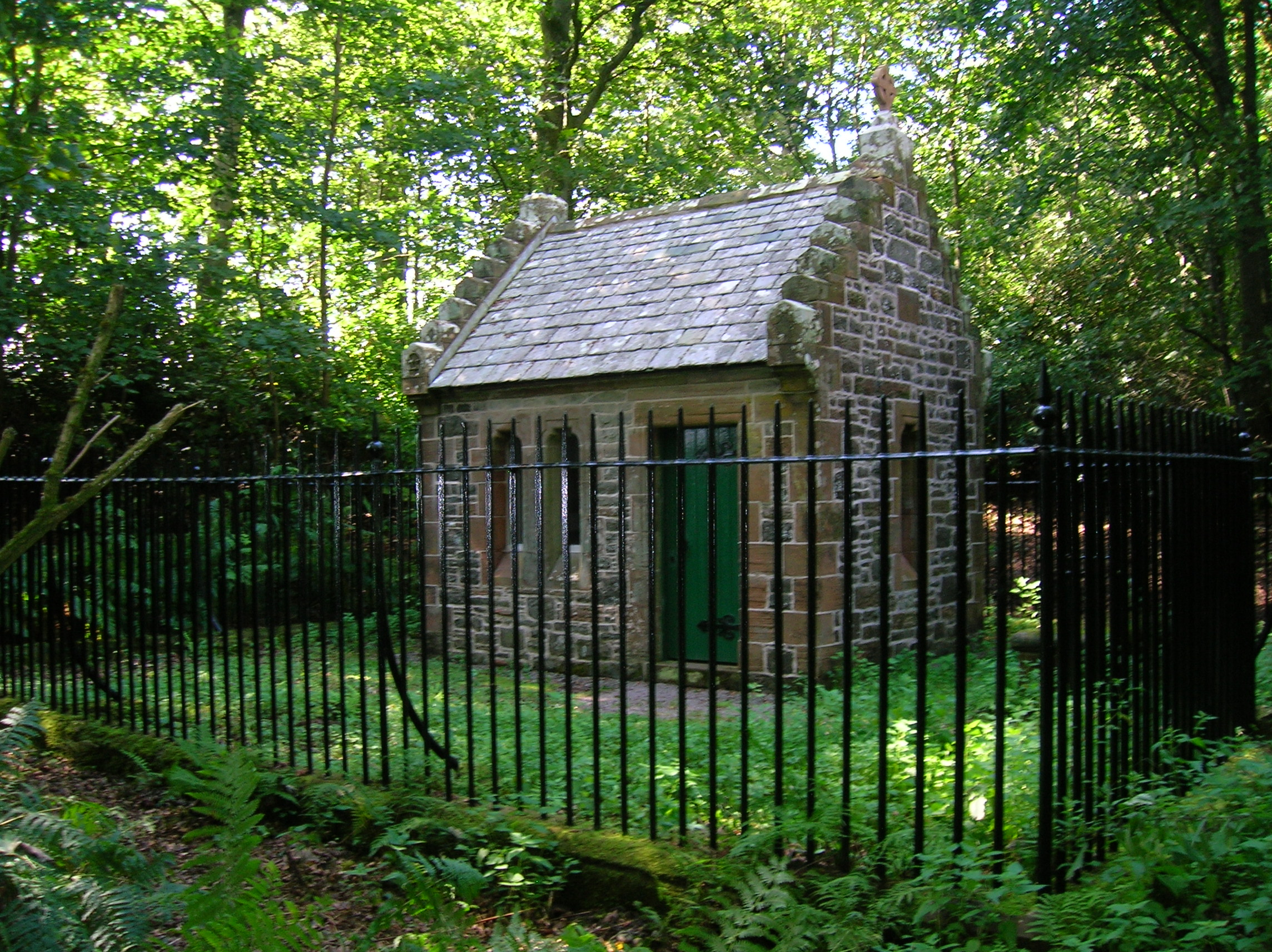
- Robert Burns' Hermitage at the Friars Carse

- Location of The Hermitage in Dumfries and Galloway
- 55.143981°N 3.6875305°W
- Type: Hermitage Folly
- Location: Auldgirth, Dumfries, Scotland; UK grid reference NX9253884593

History
- Built: 18th century and rebuilt in 1874
- Built by: Robert Riddell, later rebuilt by Thomas Nelson

Site notes
- Owner: Post Office Fellowship of Remembrance Ltd.

Listed Building – Category B
- Official name: Friars Carse Burns Hermitage
- Designated: 26 June 1986
- Reference no.: LB4233

The Hermitage was a folly first built by Captain Robert Riddell of Friars Carse (known as Glenriddell at this time and later returned to its ancient name) as part of his enthusiasm for antiquities. It is famous for its connection with the bard Robert Burns who through his friendship with Riddell was permitted to use it to compose poetry in this secluded and tranquil sylvan spot. Burns also used his diamond point pen to engrave lines on the window pane at the Hermitage following the premature death of Riddell. The original Hermitage fell into disrepair and was rebuilt in 1874. It was further restored to its former glory more recently (2009).

== The building ==
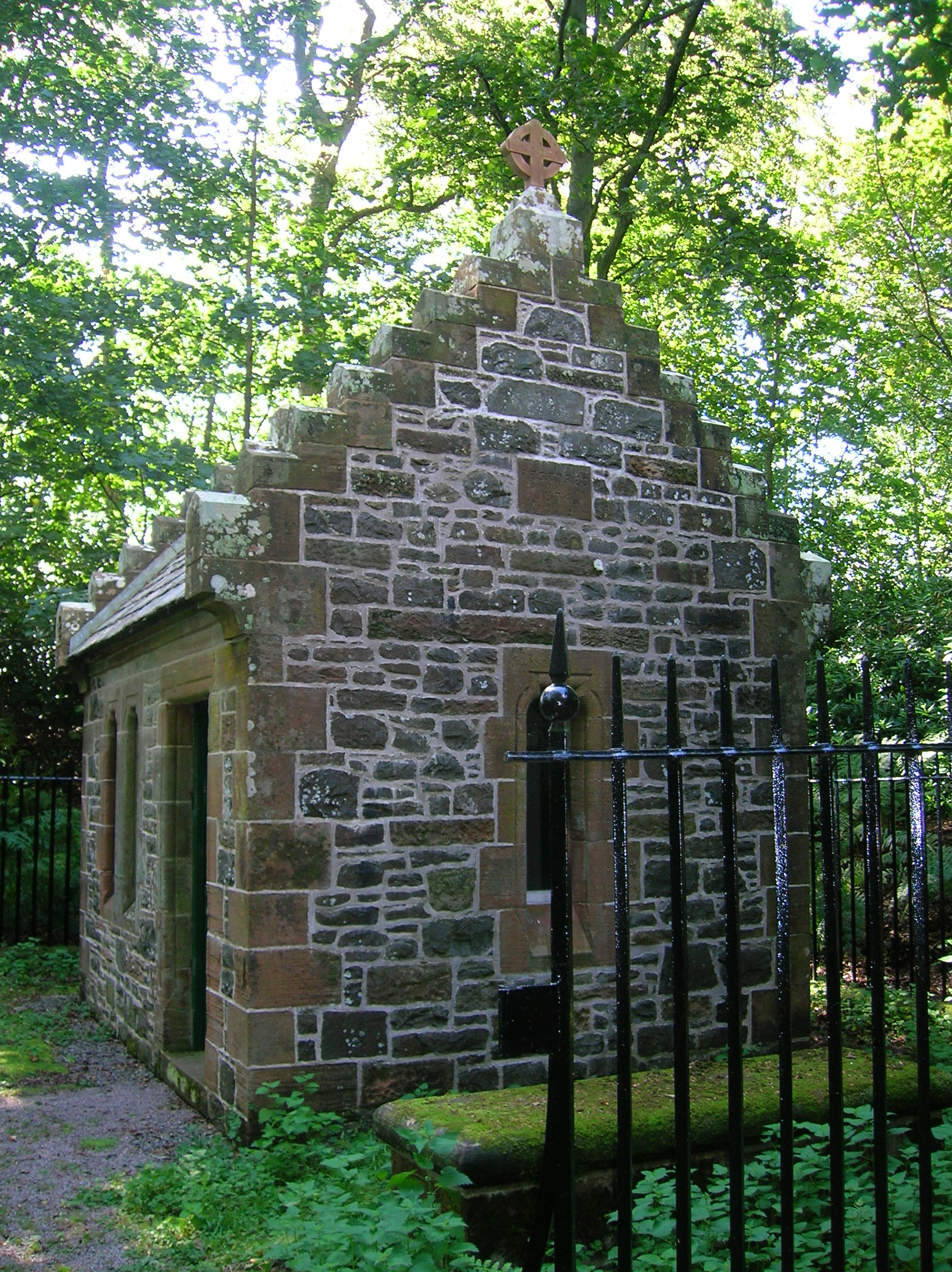
Burns's Hermitage

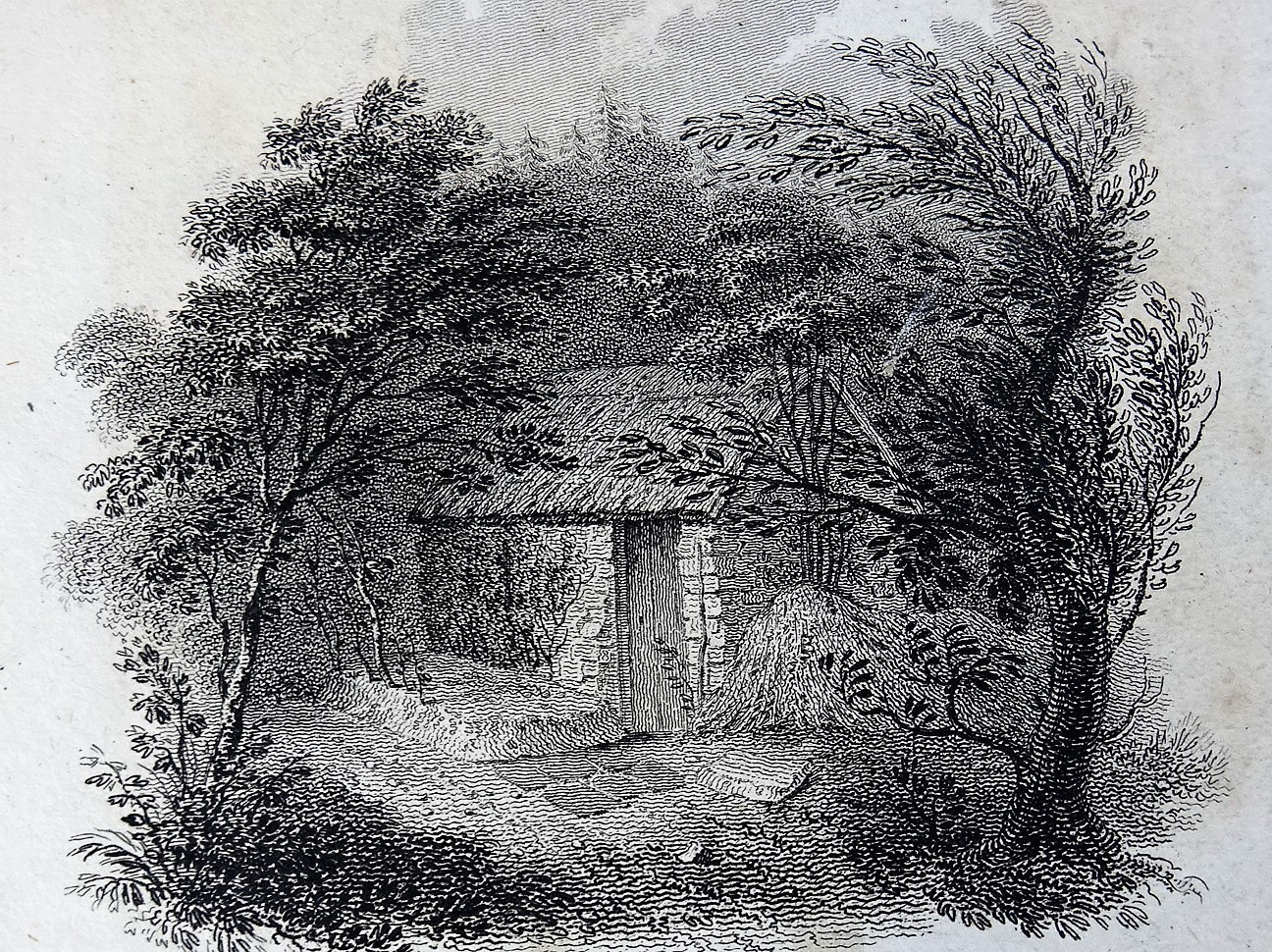
Engraving of the hermitage from 1805

Captain Robert Riddell of Glenriddell had built a small summer house, an "ivied cot" folly called the 'Hermitage' in the Crow Wood, a secluded part of the estate, just a few fields away from Ellisland. The building was constructed in the mode of a medieval anchorites cell. Burns often used the building in this idyllic setting for writing poetry, having been given the key to the gate set in the Ellisland march-dyke and probably also enjoying drinking sessions here with Riddell as well as occasionally sleeping here.

Riddell had written a medieval ballad in Middle Scots in 1790 Bedesman on Nydsyde and may have seen the Hermitage as a Bedesman's Cell. A bedesman was a person in medieval times who was paid to pray for the soul of others.

Riddell died on the 20 April 1794 at the early age of only 39 and the Hermitage was allowed to quietly decay; by 1803 it was being used by stray stock. Its appearance in 1805 was similar to its present design minus the crow steps on the gable ends and the roof is thatched. Robert Burns's friendship with Riddell had ceased in December 1793 after an incident at Friars Carse and he had to secretly return to engrave lines to his old friend on the window.

In 1805 however it is recorded that Dr Smith RN of Friars' Carse had made some repairs to the hermitage and in addition a bay tree had recently been planted nearby in Burns's memory. In 1810 it was reported by Robert Hartley Cromek as being derelict again. He expressed his shock that the site was not being maintained under Captain Smith's ownership of the estate, for the floor was covered in straw, cattle had broken down the trees and the inscribed pane of glass had gone. At that time it measured 10.5 feet by eight and had a single window and fireplace.

The apparently roofless Hermitage lies close to the Mains Burn on the 1855 OS map and it also records a network of paths, a bridge across the Mains Burn and at the main drive junction is marked a statue of an unknown personage (speculation suggests Robert Burns) and a seat. In around 1870 William Douglas recorded that the only part of the building still standing was part of the east gable. Over the lintel was cut the name 'BURNS' in bold letters. The circa 1899 OS map however appears to shows the rebuilt Hermitage, now roofed and sitting in an enclosure. The seat and statue on the drive are no longer evident.

A watercolour of the original Hermitage purports to show it situated very close to the River Nith and therefore some distance from the present day building, suggesting that the new 'Hermitage' was built in a different location, however the 1855 OS map records the 'Burns Hermitage' in its present position.

Although the original building no longer exists, Mr Thomas Nelson of Friars Carse built another 'Hermitage', of a different design, on the same site in 1874. The British Listed Building register sees it as a 're-surfaced' building of circa 1790. Adamson visited it in 1879 and records that it contained the rigid form of a monk, with shaven crown, chipped nose, and folded hands, lying on its back at the entrance. The building otherwise only contained a chair and a small table. The building was recently (2009) restored again and now has an interpretation board detailing its history and a trail guide indicates its location. The Hermitage lies within the private grounds of Friars Carse Hotel. It is a Category B listed building.

== Poetry ==
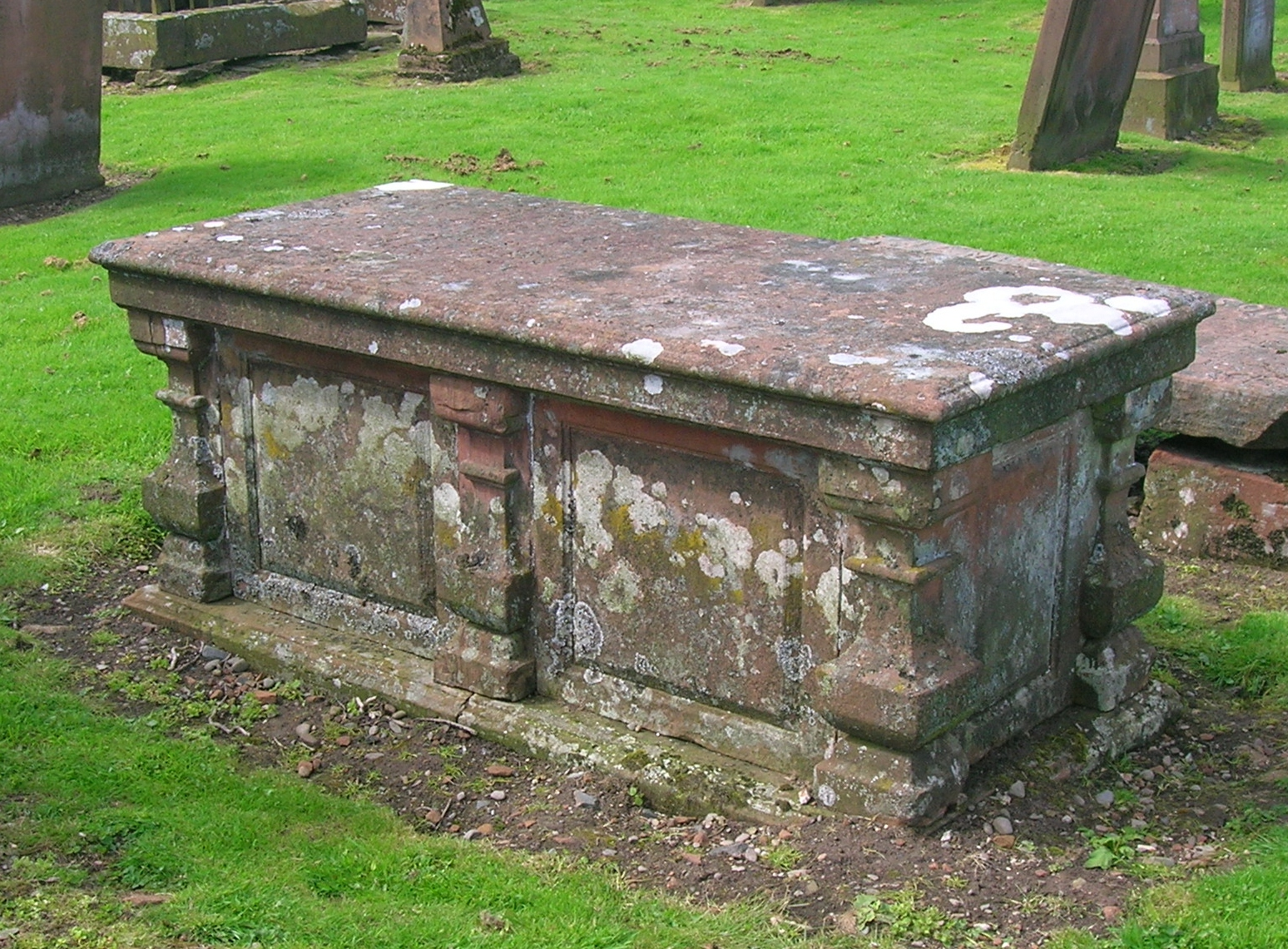
Robert Riddell's tomb.

=== Composed at the Hermitage ===
By 28 June 1788 Robert Burns had written "Verses in Friars' Carse Hermitage" and a few months later he expanded upon these, all of which helped to cement his friendship with his host.

=== Robert Burns' diamond point engraving ===
Burns engraved the following lines on the Hermitage window pane to the memory of his friend Robert Riddell:

Thou whom chance may hither lead,
Be thou clad in russet weed,
Be thou deckt in silken stole,
Grave these counsels on thy soul.

Life is but a day at most,
Sprung from night – in darkness lost;
Hope not sunshine ev'ry hour,
Fear not clouds will always lour.

The original pane was preserved and is now in the Ellisland Farm Museum, having been removed by a new owner of the property and in time coming up for sale at the death of an old lady in 1835 and being purchased for five guineas. The new building's window had the same lines inscribed upon it, however they are now in the mansion house and the Hermitage's windows now have no inscription.

The second window of the 1874 building had the following verse inscribed upon it.

To Riddel, much lamented man,
This ivied cot was dear;
Reader, dost value matchless worth?
This ivied cot revere.

Friars Carse at one time held the original Burns manuscripts of The Whistle and Lines Written in the Hermitage. In addition the first volume of the Glenriddell Manuscripts and volumes of James Johnson's The Scots Musical Museum with interleaved pages carrying Burns's explanatory comments on the songs were kept here at one time.

== See also ==
- Robert Burns World Federation
- Burns Clubs
