= List of listed buildings in Closeburn, Dumfries and Galloway =

This is a list of listed buildings in the parish of Closeburn in Dumfries and Galloway, Scotland.

== List ==
Name	Location	Date Listed	Grid Ref. (Note: Sometimes known as OSGB36, the grid reference (where provided) is based on the British national grid reference system used by the Ordnance Survey. • "Guide to National Grid". Ordnance Survey. • "Get-a-map". Ordnance Survey.)	Geo-coordinates	Notes	LB Number (Note: Historic Environment Scotland assign a unique alphanumeric identifier to each designated site in Scotland, for listed buildings this always begins with "LB", for example "LB12345".)	Image
Auldgirth Inn				55°09′41″N 3°42′27″W	Category B	3967	Upload Photo
Ballochan Linn Railway Viaduct				55°10′10″N 3°42′44″W	Category B	3968	Upload Photo
Dalgarnock Old Burial Ground				55°13′26″N 3°46′07″W	Category B	4013	Upload Photo
Blackwood: House, Cottages and Walled Garden				55°09′57″N 3°42′59″W	Category B	4041	Upload Photo
Cample Viaduct				55°13′45″N 3°44′05″W	Category B	4002	Upload another image
Claughrie				55°10′50″N 3°42′30″W	Category B	4003	Upload Photo
Locherben Farmhouse				55°15′25″N 3°38′30″W	Category C(S)	3949	Upload Photo
Auchenrennie				55°10′58″N 3°42′34″W	Category B	3965	Upload Photo
Closeburn Church and Gatepiers				55°12′45″N 3°43′28″W	Category B	4007	Upload another image
Closeburn Mains Walled Garden				55°12′55″N 3°43′03″W	Category C(S)	4010	Upload Photo
64 Closeburn Village				55°12′45″N 3°44′07″W	Category B	4012	Upload Photo
Kirkland Lodge				55°13′06″N 3°45′30″W	Category C(S)	3948	Upload Photo
Park Village, Limekilns				55°12′13″N 3°43′06″W	Category B	167	Upload Photo
Shawsholm House				55°12′15″N 3°45′09″W	Category B	169	Upload Photo
Auchencairn Farmhouse and Steading				55°11′54″N 3°41′39″W	Category C(S)	3964	Upload Photo
Cample Mill				55°13′46″N 3°44′00″W	Category B	4001	Upload another image
Closeburn Mains (formerly Closeburn Hall Stables)				55°12′59″N 3°43′03″W	Category C(S)	4009	Upload another image
Closeburn School				55°12′49″N 3°43′41″W	Category B	4011	Upload another image
Kirkbog Farmhouse				55°13′35″N 3°46′25″W	Category C(S)	3946	Upload Photo
Kirkland House				55°13′07″N 3°45′45″W	Category C(S)	3947	Upload Photo
Wallacehall Assessment Centre (former Academy and Schoolhouse)				55°12′49″N 3°43′35″W	Category A	3953	Upload Photo
Gubhill Farmhouse				55°12′47″N 3°37′00″W	Category C(S)	3945	Upload Photo
Newton Farmhouse and Steading Range adjoining at South				55°14′54″N 3°43′27″W	Category B	3950	Upload Photo
Auldgirth Bridge				55°09′34″N 3°42′35″W	Category A	3966	Upload another image
Shotts Smithy				55°12′13″N 3°42′53″W	Category B	3951	Upload Photo
Townpark				55°13′04″N 3°43′07″W	Category B	3952	Upload Photo
Closeburn Castle				55°12′41″N 3°43′06″W	Category B	4004	Upload another image
Closeburn Castle South Lodge and Gatepiers				55°12′25″N 3°42′55″W	Category B	4006	Upload Photo
Rosebank				55°13′35″N 3°46′08″W	Category B	168	Upload Photo
Closeburn Castle Gatepiers (to East of Castle)				55°12′42″N 3°43′01″W	Category C(S)	4005	Upload Photo
Closeburn Old Church, Kirkpatrick of Closeburn Mausoleum and Churchyard Enclosure				55°12′46″N 3°43′28″W	Category B	4008	Upload another image
Dressertland Farm Roofed Midden				55°13′42″N 3°43′17″W	Category B	3944	Upload Photo

== Key ==
The scheme for classifying buildings in Scotland is:

- Category A: "buildings of national or international importance, either architectural or historic; or fine, little-altered examples of some particular period, style or building type."
- Category B: "buildings of regional or more than local importance; or major examples of some particular period, style or building type, which may have been altered."
- Category C: "buildings of local importance; lesser examples of any period, style, or building type, as originally constructed or moderately altered; and simple traditional buildings which group well with other listed buildings."

In March 2016 there were 47,288 listed buildings in Scotland. Of these, 8% were Category A, and 50% were Category B, with the remaining 42% being Category C.
