= John Bacon (landlord) =

19th century vintner and Scottish innkeeper

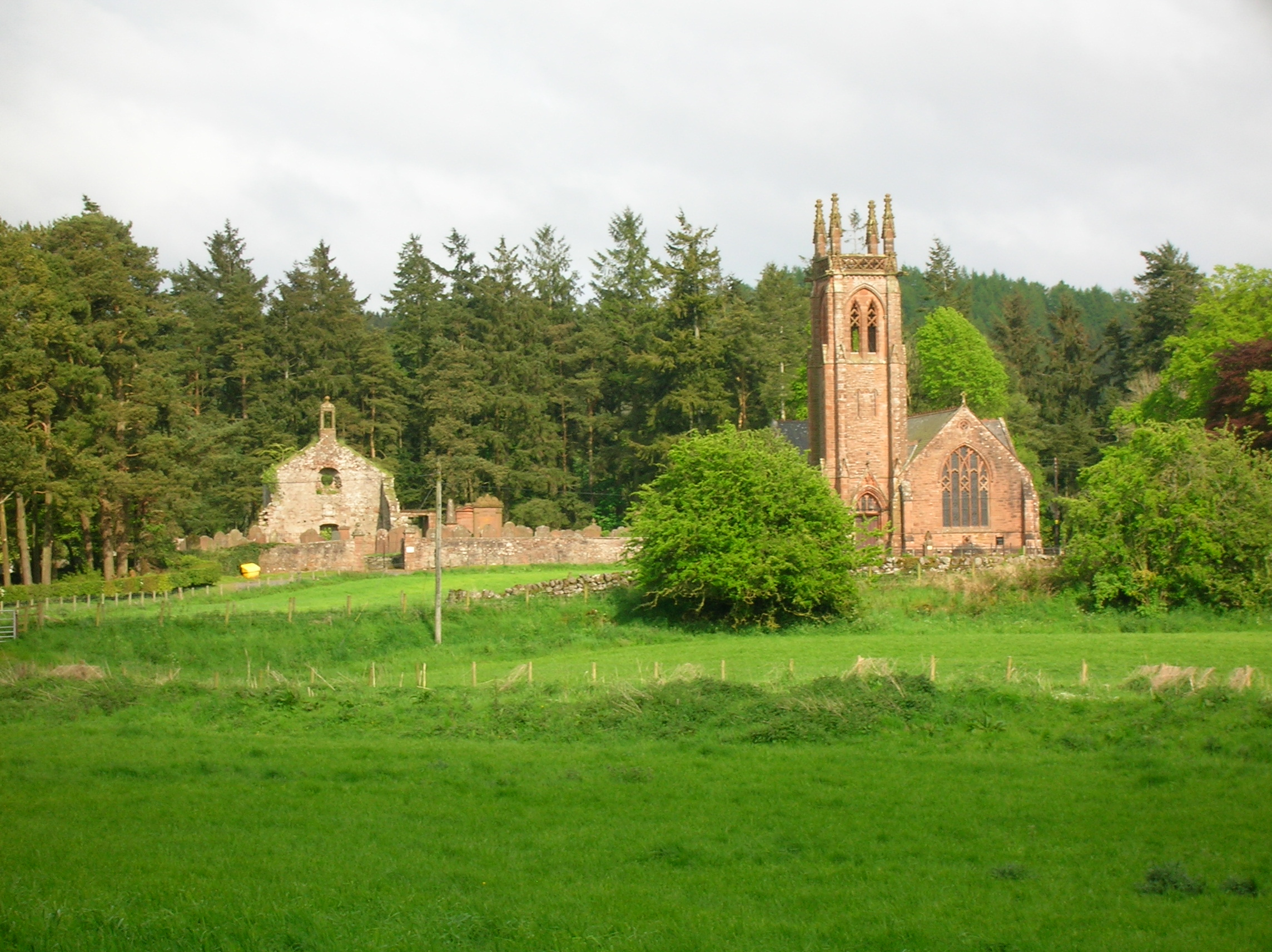
- Closeburn Church and the old Kirk
- Died: 1 November 1824
- Occupation: Innkeeper

John Bacon (d. 1824) was a vintner and the landlord at the one time important hostelry named the Brownhill Inn, which lay in open country to the south of Closeburn in Nithsdale on the Ayr to Dumfries Road. From 1788 to 1791 the poet Robert Burns spent many an evening at Bacon's inn whilst travelling on his Excise duties. A coaching stop and hostelry, the inn lay about 7 miles north of Ellisland Farm, Burns's home before the family moved into Dumfries. During their tour of August–September 1803 Dorothy Wordsworth, with her brother William Wordsworth and mutual friend Samuel Taylor Coleridge were hosted by Bacon and his wife at their inn.

== Life, family and character ==
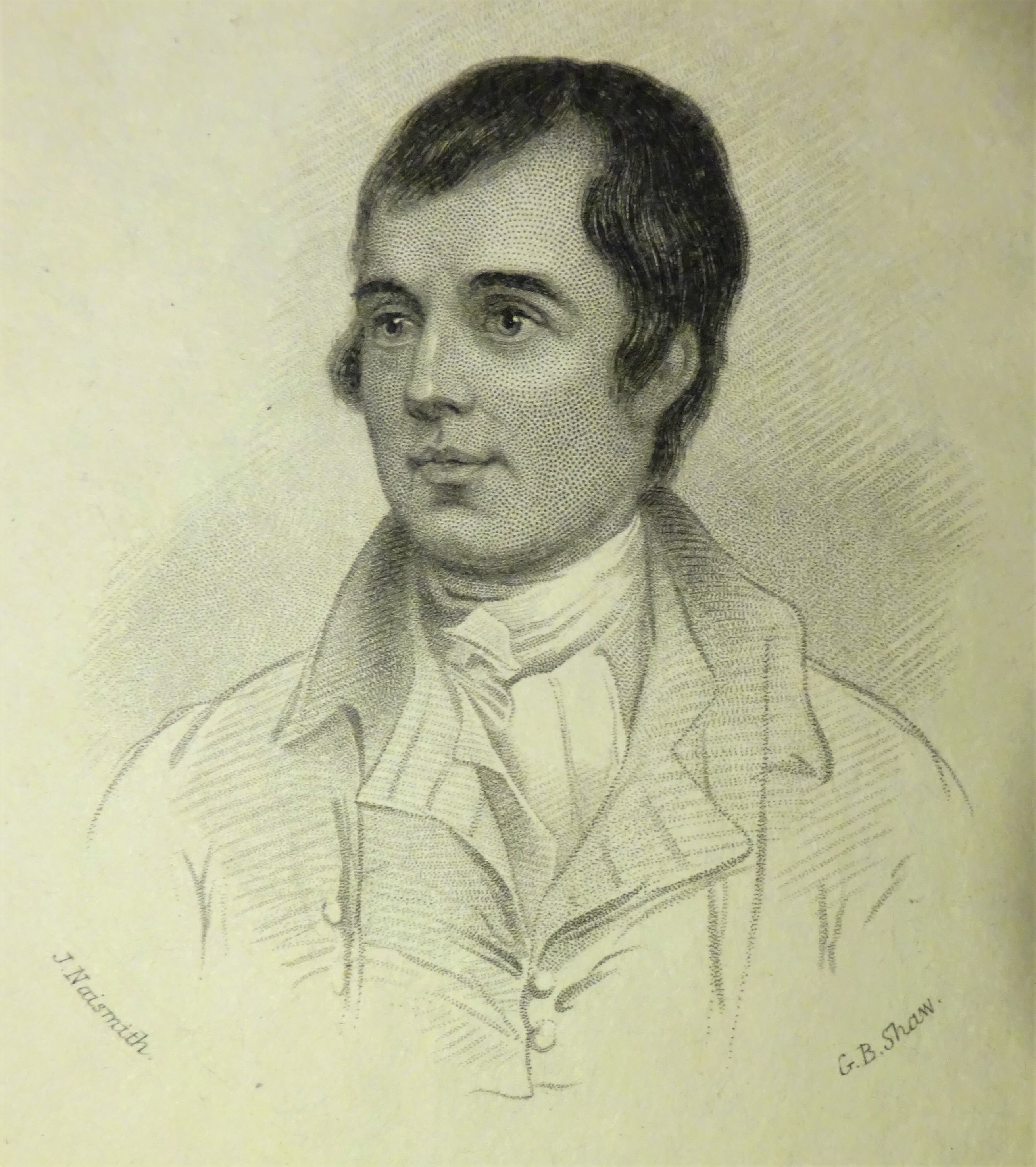
Robert Burns

Bacon's wife and the landlady at the Brownhill Inn, was Catherine Stewart whose parents had run an inn at Closeburn Kirk Bridge. John and Catherine were married at Closeburn Kirk on 2 October 1782.

Thomas Stewart and Jean Lees of Closeburn Kirk Brig were parents to a Catherine Stewart born on 16 February 1790. Catherine pre-deceased her husband who died in 1824 and John and Joseph Bacon recorded as his executors and closest relatives, could have been their sons.

In 1803 an idea of how they kept the inn was given by Dorothy Wordsworth who wrote that "It was as pretty a room as a thoroughly dirty one could be, a square parlour painted green, but so covered over with smoke and dirt that it looked not unlike green seen through black gauze."

The list of his chattels upon his death in 1824 includes farm stock and crops, suggesting that he was involved in farming in some way.

Polly Stewart, William Stewart's daughter would often stay with her aunt and uncle at the inn and she would have met Robert Burns there.

In 1797 Bacon had six horses that were kept in the stables on the west side of the road. He also had one four wheeled carriage.

Burns, when asked on one occasion by a commercial traveller, surnamed Ladyman, to prove that it was really the famous poet that he was dining on bacon and beans with, Burns made up on the spot the following epigram that highlighted the personality quirk of Bacon to often overstay his welcome when serving customers:

"At Brownhill we always get dainty good cheer,
And plenty of bacon each day in the year;
We've a'thing that's nice, and mostly in season,
But why always Bacon — Come, tell me the reason?"

Burns had recited the lines extempore when Bacon went out to see about fetching fresh supplies of whisky toddy.

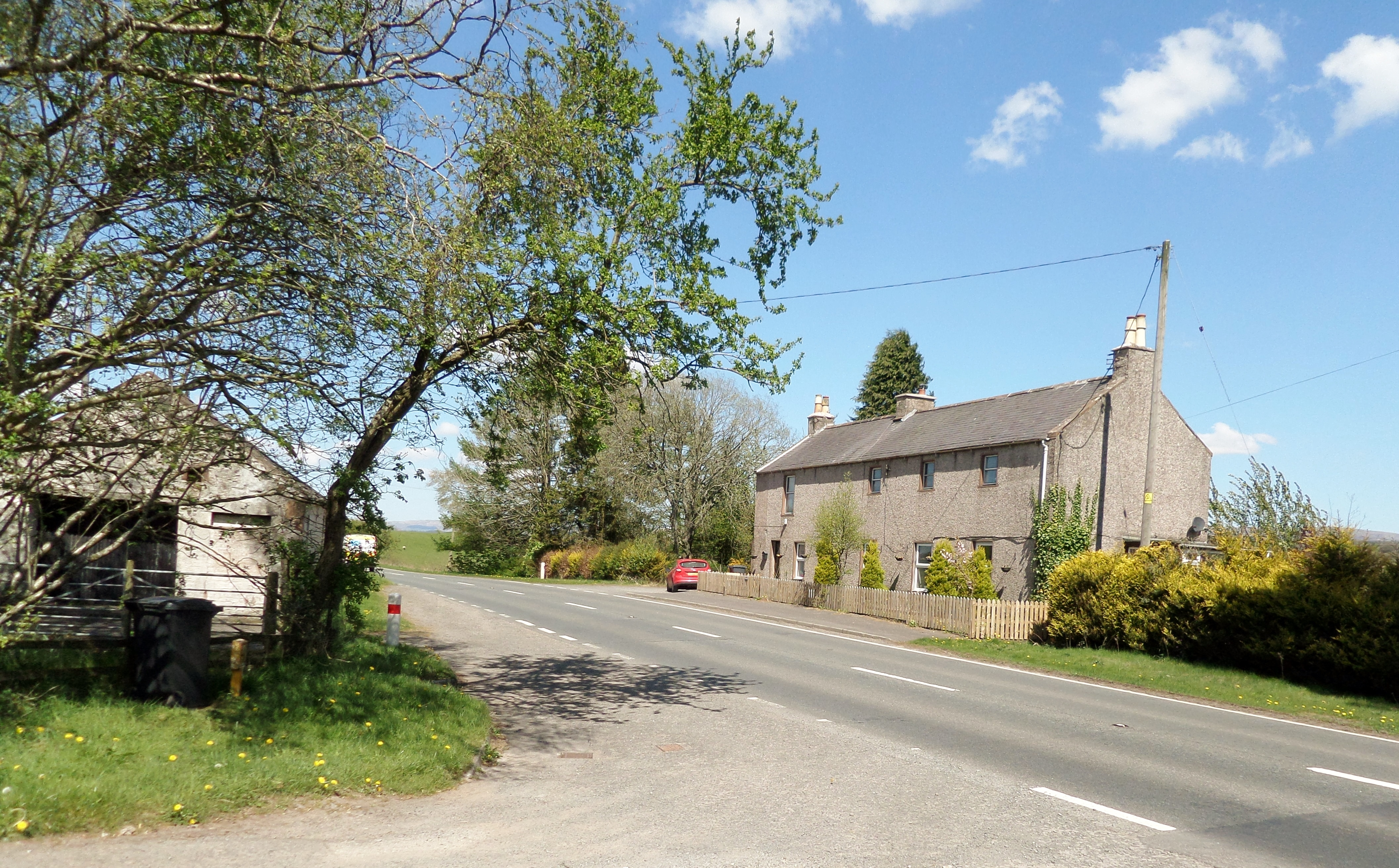
The Brownhill Inn

Bacon however took a keen interest in the poet and in 1798 purchased the bed that Burns was born in from Gilbert Burns at nearby Dinning Farm. Bacon installed the bed at Brownhill and showing his business acumen, charged customers and others to see it. A groom at Brownhill, Joe Langhorne, slept in it for many years and in 1829 purchased it himself. Langhorne took it to Dumfries where the bed was eventually broken up by a relative and used to make snuff boxes that bore a commemorative inscription to Burns.

Bacon's brother-in-law, his wife's brother, was William Stewart (1749-1812), son therefore of the innkeepers at Closeburn Kirk Bridge. William was the factor or grieve at the Dalswinton Estate of the Rev. James Stuart Menteith and a good friend of Robert Burns who often visited Closeburn Castle. He was the father of "lovely Polly Stewart", and the brother-in-law to John Bacon the Landlord.

In 1788, Bacon's wife, Catherine Stewart, inspired an offended Burns to compose the poem "The Henpecked Husband" upon her refusing to serve her husband and the poet with more liquor when Burns was staying the night and they were engaged in a drinking bout at Brownhill. How much is truly revealed by Burns of the Landlord's personality is open to question:

"Curs'd be the man, the poorest wretch in life,
The crouching vassal to a tyrant wife!
Who has no will but by her high permission,
Who has not sixpence but in her possession;
Who must to he, his dear friend's secrets tell,
Who dreads a curtain lecture worse than hell.
Were such the wife had fallen to my part,
I'd break her spirit or I'd break her heart;
I'd charm her with the magic of a switch,
I'd kiss her maids, and kick the perverse bitch".

John Bacon died, intestate, on the 1 November 1824 and the court records show that he had two executors who were his closest living relatives, John Bacon of Huntingdon and Joseph Bacon of Whitehaven. His estate was worth £1037 19s 11 1/4d.

== Association with Robert Burns ==
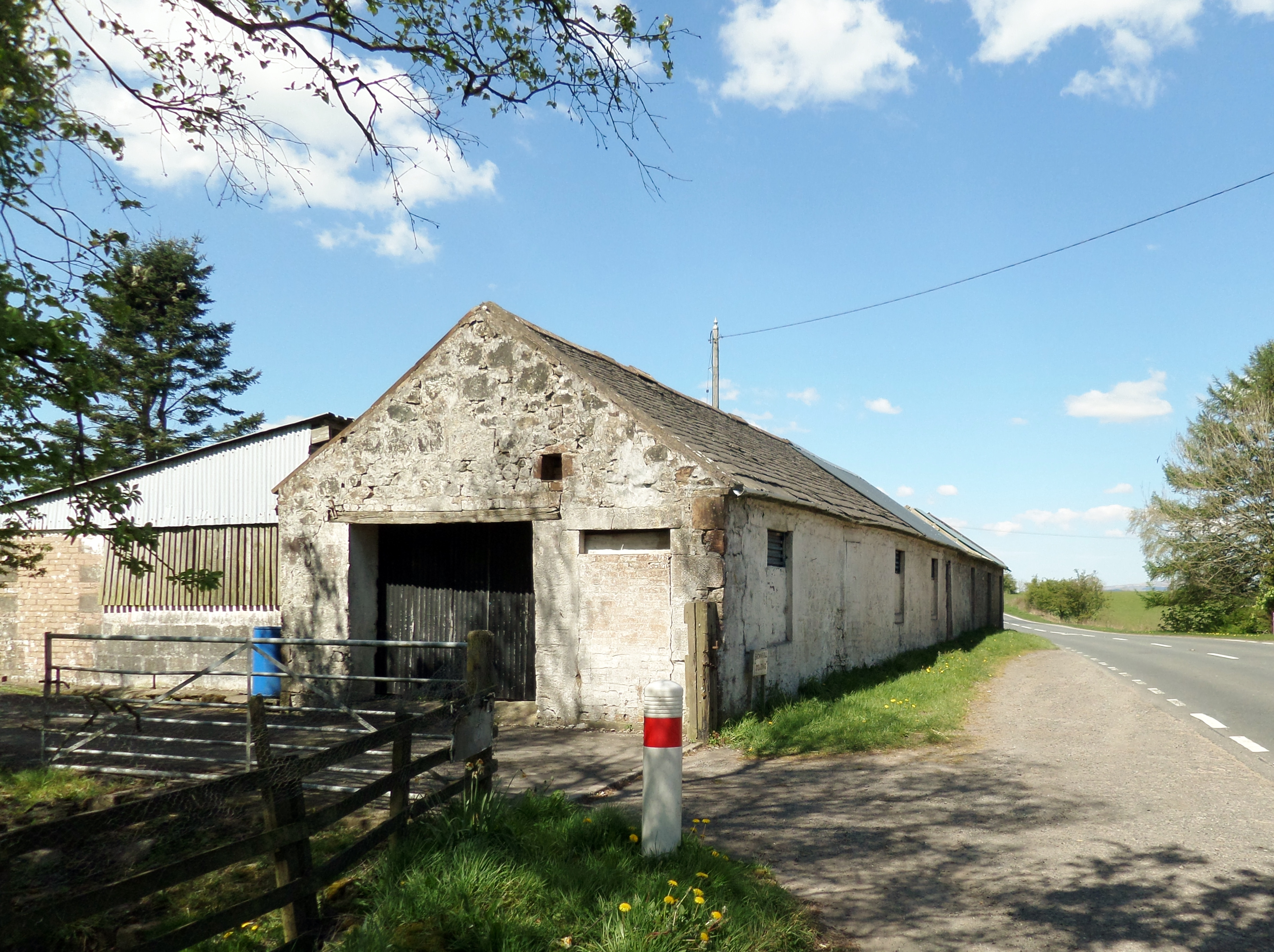
A view of the old livery stables and cart sheds looking north.

The 'Ayrshire Monthly Newsletter' of 1844 reported that "At the sale of the effects of Mr Bacon, Brownhill Inn, after his death in 1825, his snuff-box, being found to bear the inscription: "Robert Burns - Officer of the Excise" - although only a 'cloot' or horn mounted with silver, sold for £5. It was understood to have been presented by Burns to Bacon, with whom he had spent many a merry night."

One summer evening in 1793, whilst dining at the inn with Dr Purdie of Sanquhar and another friend, Burns encountered a weary soldier and upon listening to his story of the many adventures he had lived through, was inspired to write his famous song "The Soldier's Return"

When wild war's deadly blast was blawn,
And gentle peace returning,
Wi' mony a sweet babe fatherless,
And mony a widow mourning;
I left the lines and tented field,
Where lang I'd been a lodger,
My humble knapsack a' my wealth,
A poor and honest sodger.

In 1791 Burns on one occasion angered Bacon's wife by engraving the lines "You're Welcome, Willie Stewart" on a glass tumbler with his diamond-point pen. Catherine however was able to sell the glass tumbler for a shilling to a customer, who purchased it as a memento. Another version of the story places the event at the Closeburn Kirk Bridge Inn where the landlady was Catherine Stewart Bacon's mother.

Chorus

You're welcome, Willie Stewart,
You're welcome, Willie Stewart,
There's ne'er a flower that blooms in May,
That's half sae welcome's thou art!

Come, bumpers high, express your joy,
The bowl we maun renew it,
The tappet hen, gae bring her ben,
To welcome Willie Stewart, &c.

May foes be strang, and friends be slack,
Ilk action, may he rue it,
May woman on him turn her back,
That wrangs thee, Willie Stewart,

The engraved tumbler survives to this day having become a treasured part of Sir Walter Scott's collections at Abbotsford House.

Burns also wrote verses in honour of 'Polly Stewart', Bacon's niece, William Stewart's daughter.

"The flower it blaws, it fades, it fa's,
And art can ne'er renew it;
But worth, and truth, eternal youth
Will gie to Polly Stewart."

It is also recorded that 'One Monday even' Burns sent a rhymed epistle to William Stewart from Brownhill Inn, probably in January 1793, beginning :

"In honest Bacon's ingle-neuk,
Here maun I sit and think;
Sick o' the warld and warld's fock,
And sick, d-amn'd sick o' drink!"

In the Ladies' Own Journal of 3 September 1870, published in Glasgow and Edinburgh, an article was published that claimed that Burns had engraved on some window panes certain verses that even best friends were ashamed of. The article claimed that Sir Charles D. Stuart-Menteith, Bart of Closeburn Castle had these window panes carefully removed and packed away. Following his father's death Sir James is said to have examined these artefacts and was so shocked that he destroyed them in order to preserve Burns's reputation. Watson, a local man, records in 1901 that the poem concerned was "The Henpecked Husband."
