= Gatelawbridge =

Hamlet in Dumfries and Galloway, Scotland

Coordinates: 55.250°N 3.725°W

Gatelawbridge is a hamlet in the region of Dumfries and Galloway, Scotland. It is situated two and a half miles east of Thornhill and near the gorge Crichope Linn. The origin of the name is unknown though in the past the locals called it Gateley Bridge, so perhaps it takes its name from a type of bridge over the Cample River in the centre of the settlement. The river divides the parishes, with all those east of the river being in Closeburn Parish, and those west of the river being in Morton Parish.

The African explorer Joseph Thomson lived in Gatelawbridge from the age of 10 until leaving for Edinburgh. He attended the secondary school Morton Academy in Thornhill (now Wallace Hall), making the journey each day on his pony called Donald. His father was the quarry master and presumably that is where his interest in rocks began. He studied geology at the University of Edinburgh. After graduating he was engaged on several explorations in East and North Africa. He discovered the Thomson's Falls in Kenya and the Thomson's gazelle is named after him. He was known to be a kind and very fair man, who refused to beat his bearers in Africa when they did wrong, preferring to dock their wages instead. This however was quite unpopular at the time with the bearers who at one point went on strike and left him. He became ill due to infections picked up on his travels and died a young man. His friends erected a fine monument to him which stands next to the school in Thornhill.

Gatelawbridge is the site of several Red Sandstone quarries opened in the 19th century that were once linked by rail to the G&SWR main line near Cample village. They are now largely disused. The sandstone derived from a huge sand dune which extended from Gatelawbridge through Locharbriggs to Annan. This sandstone is the building material of much of Dumfriesshire, and was exported to America where it was used to build the famous 'brownstones' of New York. The hamlet has seen a lot of growth recently with several new houses being constructed.

== See also ==
- Deil's Dyke - A linear earthwork.
