= Closeburn, Dumfries and Galloway =

Village in rural lowland Scotland

Coordinates: 55.212°N 3.734°W

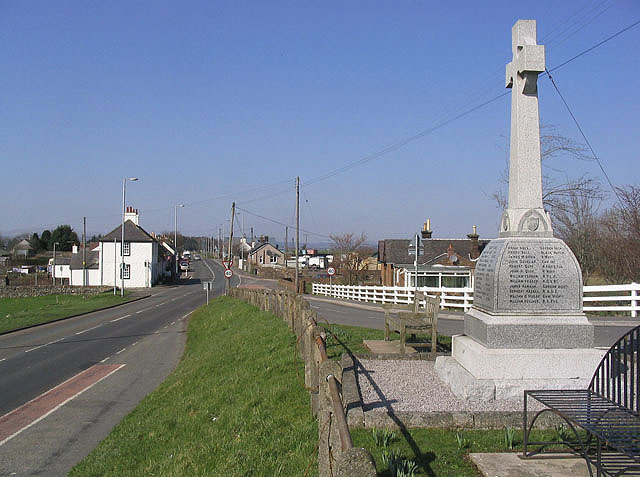
Closeburn

Closeburn (Scottish Gaelic: Cill Osbairn) is a village and civil parish in Dumfries and Galloway, Scotland. The village is on the A76 road 2 1/2 miles (4 km) south of Thornhill. In the 2001 census, Closeburn had a population of 1,119. Closeburn is recorded as Killosbern in 1185. The first element of the name is Gaelic cill 'cell or church'. The second element is a saint's name, but none has definitely been identified.

Between 1849 and 1961 the village had a railway station. Although Closeburn railway station is now closed, the Glasgow South Western Line still runs through the village. The nearest stations are at Sanquhar and Dumfries.

The village is the former location of Wallace Hall, founded in 1723 and now based in Thornhill. The former schoolhouse, built in 1795 and incorporating the original buildings from the 1720s, is a Category A listed building.

Situated two-thirds of a mile (1.1 km) east of the village is Closeburn Castle, a Category B listed tower house that was until 1783 the family seat of the Kirkpatrick family.

The River Nith is on the western boundary of the parish of Closeburn. The eastern part of the parish contains several hills, including the 2,286 feet (697 m) Queensberry, at the southern end of the Lowther Hills, part of the Southern Uplands. Several streams flow through the area, and the gorge and waterfall at Crichope Linn, 3 1/2 miles (6 km) north-north-east of Closeburn was chosen by Walter Scott in his novel Old Mortality as the lair of John Balfour of Burley.

The hamlet of Gatelawbridge, 2 1/2 miles (4 km) east of Thornhill, is on the boundary of Closeburn and Morton parishes near Crichope Linn.

The nearby Brownhill Inn was a favourite haunt of the poet Robert Burns whilst he was working at an excise man or gauger in the area and was the site of inspirational events that led to the bard writing several poems, odes, etc. John Bacon was the landlord immortalised in verse by Burns and his wife was Catherine Stewart whose parents had run the Closeburn Kirk Brig Inn. Her brother was Willie Stewart who was the factor or grieve of the Closeburn Castle estate.

== Notable residents ==
- John Bacon was a friend of Robert Burns, a vintner and landlord at the Brownhill Inn.
- Prof John Hunter FRSE LLD, joint founder of the Royal Society of Edinburgh, born here in 1746.
- James Williamson, church minister, mathematician and joint founder of the Royal Society of Edinburgh was minister here in 1757.

== See also ==
- List of listed buildings in Closeburn, Dumfries and Galloway
- Dalgarnock Village, Church and Parish
- Barburgh Mill, Closeburn
