= Crichope Linn =

Gorge in Dumfries and Galloway, Scotland

Coordinates: 55.2414°N 3.7142°W

Crichope Linn or Crichop Linn, originally Creehope is a gorge and waterfall near Gatelawbridge in Dumfries and Galloway, southern Scotland. Linn is the Scots language word for waterfall. The etymology of the names 'Cree' or 'Crich' may derive from Gaelic for 'Boundary' and 'Hope' from the Scots for 'a valley among hills,' an apt description.

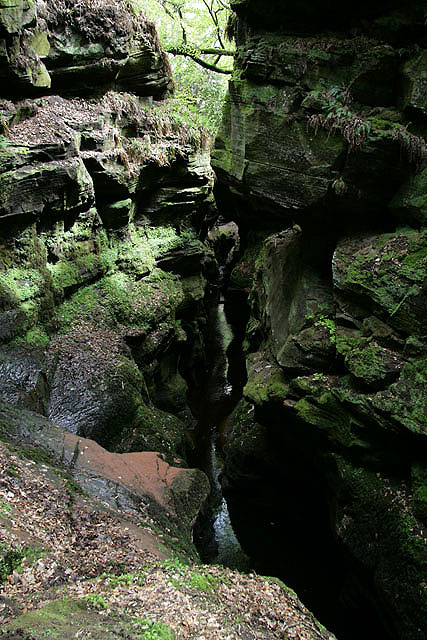
Crichope Linn

== The Glen and linn ==
It is over 30 metres (98 ft) deep and is formed from the action of the stream, Crichope Burn, on the soft red sandstone that underlies much of the area. The gorge was long believed to harbour supernatural beings, and a natural rock cell, the "Elf's Kirk" (long since broken up for building stone), stood at its entrance where elves, the supernatural inhabitants of the linn were once said to congregate. A natural archway on the footpath along the side of the gorge bears many 18th and 19th century inscriptions, supposedly including one by Robert Burns.

The Ordnance Survey gives a few place names such as the 'Souter's Seat' and 'Burley's Leap' near by. Hell's Cauldron lies below the falls. The 'Gullet Spout' is marked further up the glen.

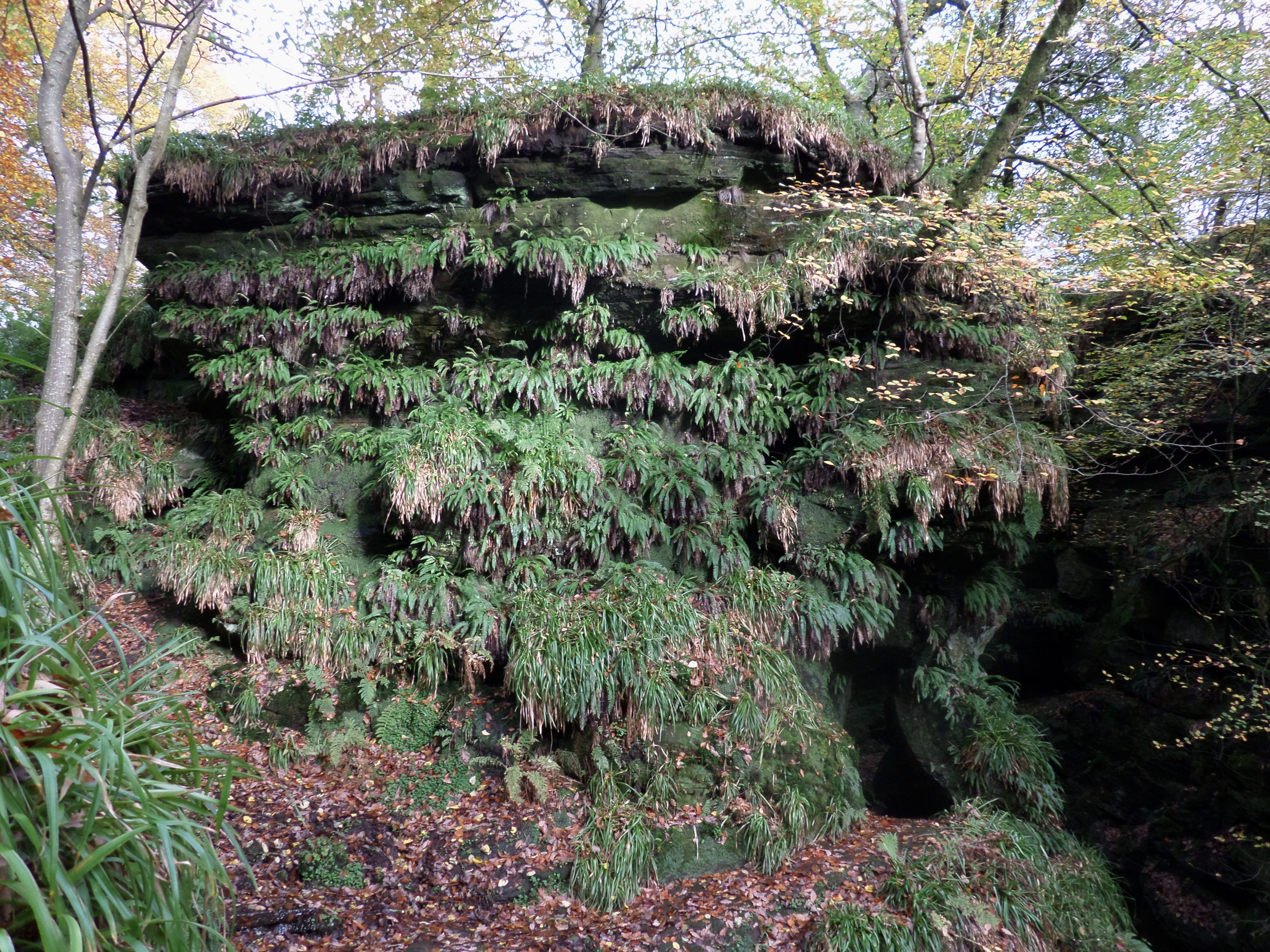
The stone arch with Burley's Leap above.

Once entered via a stone arch the glen in the 19th century had an extensive path network with several bridges crossing over the Crichope Burn at convenient places or where the view was most spectacular such as at 'Burley's Leap'. The red sandstone abutments of one of the bridges still lie in the Crichope Burn before the red sandstone gorge is reached. The paths are no longer maintained and in several places the route is hazardous.

== Covenanters ==
In the 17th century, Covenanters used Crichope Linn as a hiding place and a natural seat in the form of a chair acquired the name 'Sutors Seat' after a shoemaker who once hid. Probably as a result of a visit to the linn, Walter Scott is said to have been charmed by it and chose it as the lair of John Balfour of Burleigh in Old Mortality.

== Eminent visitors ==
Sir Walter Scott had explored the glen whilst visiting his brother who was taught at the nearby Wallace Hall School in Closeburn and mentioned the graffiti left by some of the many visitors. The glen inspired a local poet, the Rev. William Haining, in the early 1900s :

Famed Crichup! Thy rude rocks and caverns hollow,
Thy wood-covered cliffs, and thy deep-channelled stream,
Invite to reflection : the impulse I follow;
The voice it is real - no false fleeting dream.

But ah! as the sun's dazzling splendours o'erpower
Each eye, save the eagle's, that gazes on high;

The famous author Thomas Carlyle made many visits, living in the area at Craigenputtock House for several years and marrying Jane Welsh at Templand Farm near Dalgarnock. He wrote some verses describing the genius loci of the glen :

"Cloistered vault of living rocks,
Here have I my darksome dwelling,
Working, sing to stones and stocks;
Where beneath my waves go welling.

Beams flood-borne athwart me cast
Arches see, and aisles moist gleaming;
Sounds for aye my organ blast,
Grim cathedral, shaped in dreaming.

Robert Forsyth published his popular five volume work "Beauties of Scotland" in 1805 in which, following his visit, he describes the "..very beautiful cascade by falling over a precipice of about 80 to 90 feet in height and perpendicular."

Robert Burns who knew the area well as a local and as a customs and excise officer, lived for a time at near by Ellisland Farm and is said to have carved his initials here.

The author Allan Cunningham carved his full name and the date 1806 on the wall of the "Sutors Seat" as recorded by local man W.A.Carruthers in 1960.

== See also ==
- Cleeves Cove
