= Dalgarven Mill – Museum of Ayrshire Country Life and Costume =

Museum in North Ayrshire, Scotland

Coordinates: 55°40′34″N 4°42′38″W

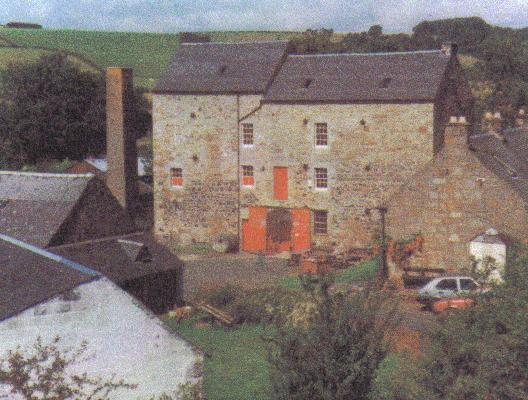
The main Dalgarven Mill buildings

Dalgarven Mill is near Kilwinning, in the Garnock Valley, North Ayrshire, Scotland and it is home to the Museum of Ayrshire Country Life and Costume. The watermill has been completely restored over a number of years and is run by the independent Dalgarven Mill Trust.

The village of Dalgarven was largely destroyed by the construction of the main A737 road, but the mill buildings survive and are open as a tourist attraction and educational resource, interpreting local history in addition to its role as a museum of Ayrshire country life. Very few functional water powered mills remain in Scotland and this is an example which has been preserved due to the foresight of the family of the last miller who saw a modern role for an ancient industrial site and traditional social meeting-place. Some of the outbuildings have been converted for rent as shops, others are still occupied as dwellings and will be put to uses that will enhance the quality of the experience of visitors to the mill complex.

The Ferguson family, descendants of the last miller, are still involved with the running of the museum, working with a board of trustees who are all volunteers. The mill is not part of the National Trust or the Museum of Scotland; it is however an accredited four star Ayrshire visitor attraction.

== History of the Dalgarven mills ==
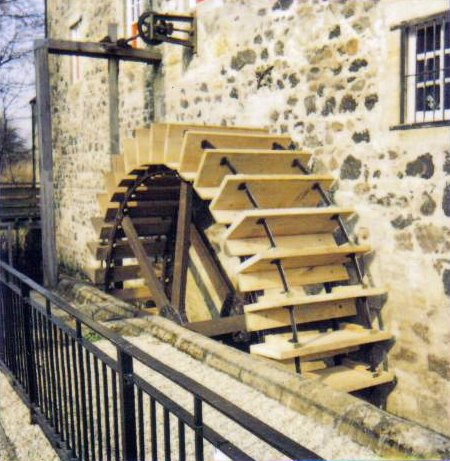
The mill waterwheel after a recent renovation

There has been a mill on this site of Groatholm since the 14th century, set up by the monks of Kilwinning Abbey. The first mill was a waulk or fulling mill producing woollen cloth. Retting was carried out here in ponds next to the river, this process being a stage in the manufacturing of vegetable fibres, especially the bast fibres. It involves submerging plant stems such as flax, jute or hemp in water, and soaking them for a period of time to loosen the fibers from the other components of the stem. The fibres can then be used to produce linen and other products, such as paper for banknotes, rope, etc.

The present mill was erected in 1614 as a corn mill and rebuilt in 1880 after being damaged by fire. The River Garnock's waters power a 6-metre diameter breast-shot wheel that drives the French burr millstones through cast iron gearing.

The traditional methods of producing flour can be followed during a tour of the mill. The wheel turns, when possible, following the almost total renewal of the mill machinery and a recent (2006-9) replacement of wooden components of the wheel, sluice, etc.

The mill race, leat or lade was critical to the efficient working of the mill and was a specialised craft; a leatwright is recorded on a grave in the Loudoun Kirk graveyard near Galston, East Ayrshire.

The weir on the River Garnock is made of boulders which are carefully placed and locked together creating a millpond that supplies a good head of water to the wheel through the lade. The weir was built on a natural dyke which runs across the Garnock at this point, its existence being carefully exploited by the monks of Kilwinning Abbey who chose the site for the mill. These dykes (bands of especially hard rock) are found at several points crossing the river and many were elsewhere were exploited as the bases for dams, such as also occurred at Cunninghamhead Mill on the River Annick.

A feature of many mills was the presence of trees or other structures shading the wheel from the intense summer sun. The reason for this was that when the wheel was not turning the wood components dried out and warped, putting a great deal of stress on the whole structure, putting it out of shape and creating breaks in the buckets, etc. At Dalgarven the wheel was originally enclosed by high walls which served the same purpose as trees.

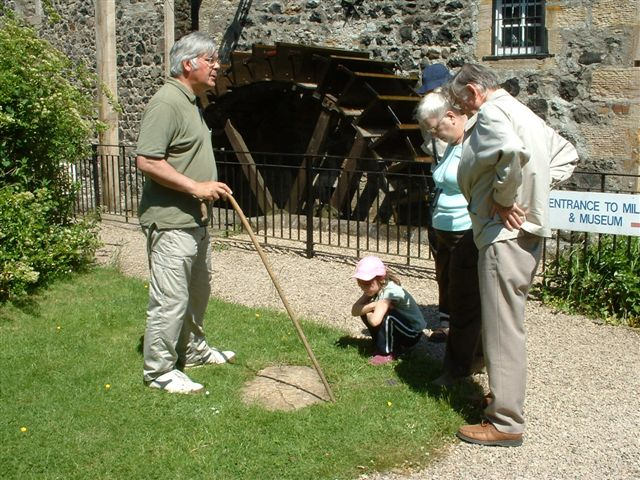
A trustee leading a guided tour, at the cup and ring marked stone.

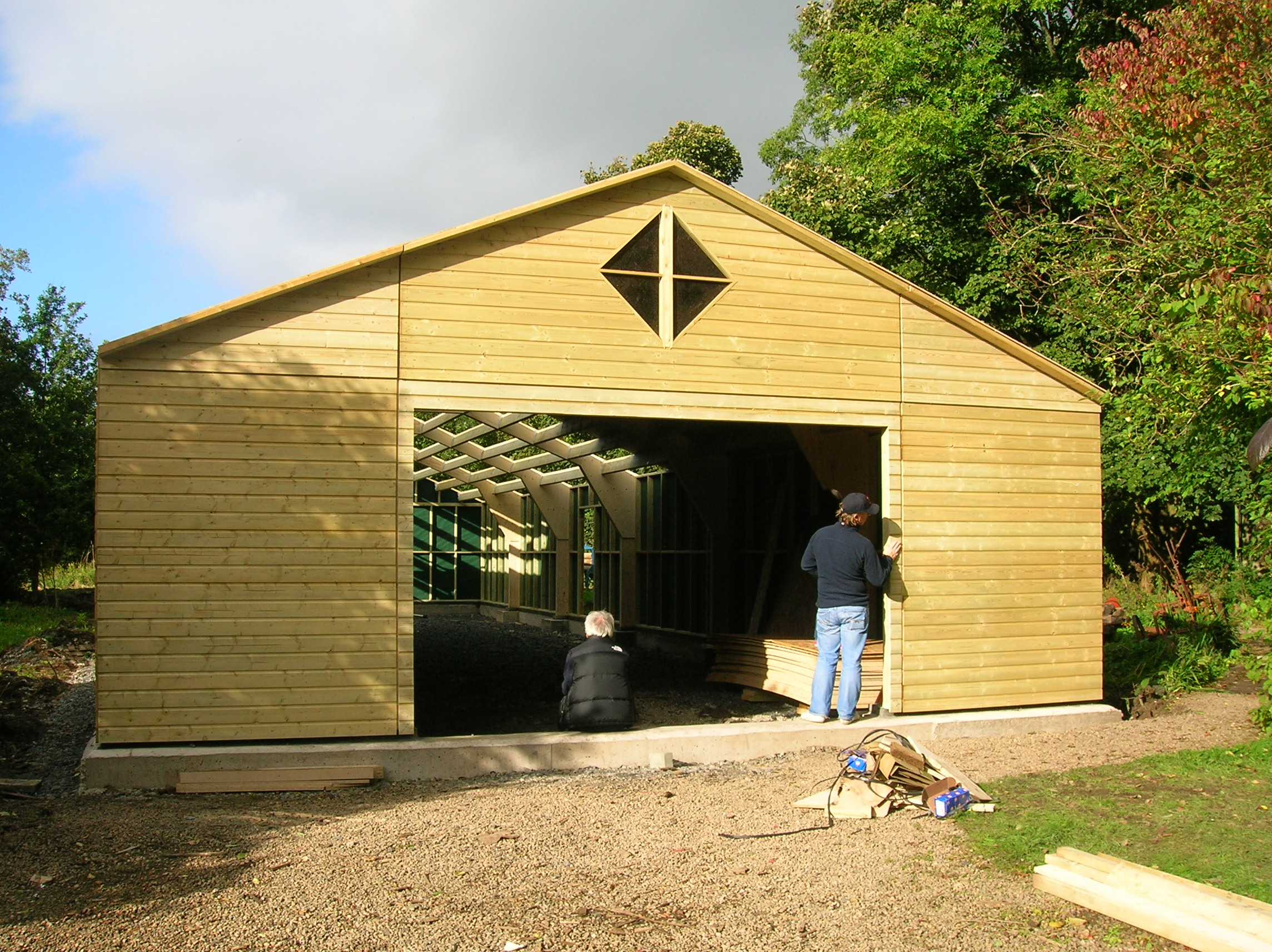
A new storage shed and workshop

The Dalgarven wheel is a low breastshot, where the water strikes the wheel at a quarter of its diameter or height of the wheel and it turns with an anti-clockwise rotation. On the outer edge of each bucket is a 'sacrificial board' which will break away if any object becomes wedged beneath it. This is very important, as the stresses and strains set up by the wheel suddenly stopping would cause considerable damage to the various cogs and to the drive to the grinding stones themselves, which have significant mass and momentum when employed in the process of grinding. The use of iron brackets to provide support to the wooden paddles on the wheel is an unusual feature. The massive wooden hirst supporting the grindstones can be viewed from inside of the mill.

In the 1940s, the miller at Dalgarven used the wheel to produce electricity which was stored in liquid acid batteries.

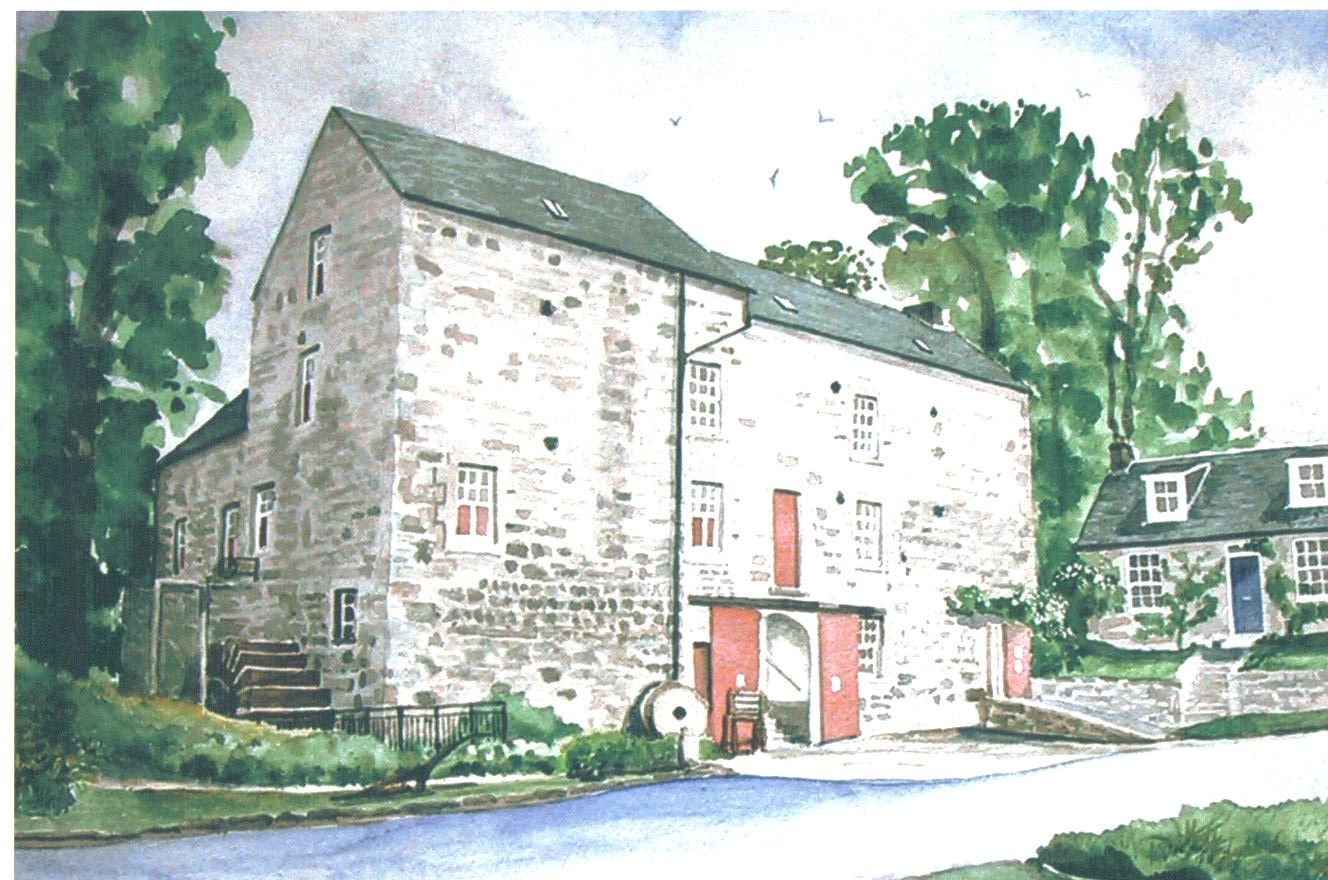
A painting of Dalgarven Mill showing the main buildings, waterwheel and cottages

The mill building has an unusual structural feature, an alcove, designed to attract nesting owls which would then feed off and help to control the vermin which stores of cereals and other foodstuffs always attract.

One feature of the mill is the relatively small number of windows. This may be purely practical, however avoidance of paying too high a 'window tax' may have been a consideration. Window tax was first levied in England in 1696 to offset the expenses of making up the gold and silver deficiency in the re-coinage of William III reign caused by clipping and filing of coins. It was set at two shillings for small tenements, six shillings for buildings with up to ten windows and ten shillings for those with twenty windows. Cottages were exempt. It was based on the number of windows in a house and large mansions often had many existing windows blocked up, such as a whole side of Loudoun Castle, in Ayrshire, Scotland. It was repealed in 1851 and replaced by a tax on inhabited houses.

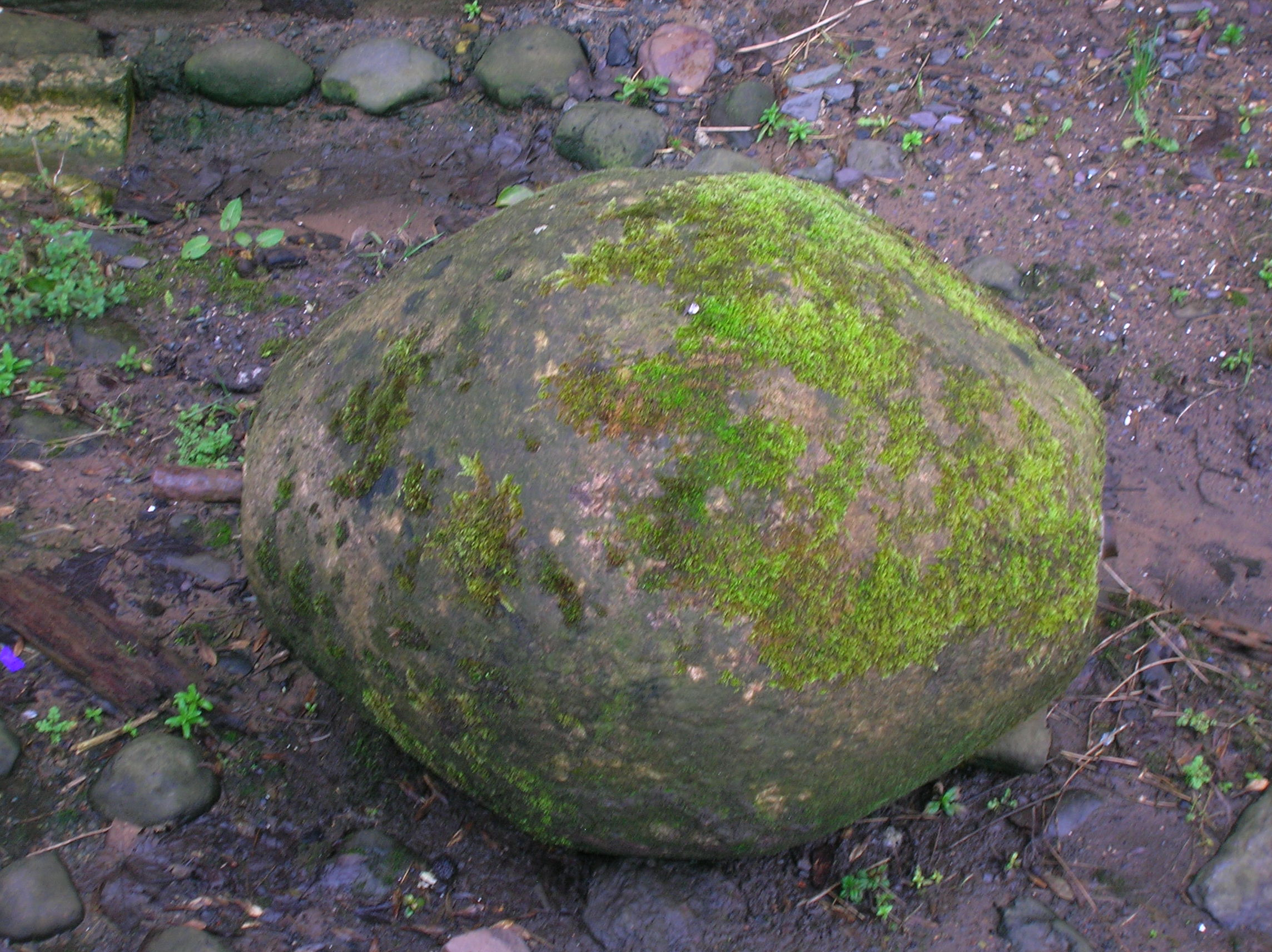
A whinstone at Dalgarven Mill, used for crushing Whin or Gorse for use as fodder for cattle

Lying on the cobbles outside the original waulk mill and stables is a large oval sandstone object with metal attachments on its central axis. This was used to crush whin or gorse in a shallow trough, the stone being dragged up and down by a horse, making the spiny and tough branches of the plant suitable for use as animal feed. It was however only used if other sources of feed were lacking.

The mill's history is laid out in the Trust's publication - A Miller's Tale. The Life and Times of Dalgarven Mill, by Robert Ferguson, son of the last miller.

Heron, on a tour of Scotland in 1799, records that the miller at Dalgarven had constructed a wooden bridge in the Japanese style and interesting gardens with patterns of low box hedges.

17th century water mill
The sounds of the mechanism grinding flour.

== "Thirlage" and the mills of Ayrshire ==
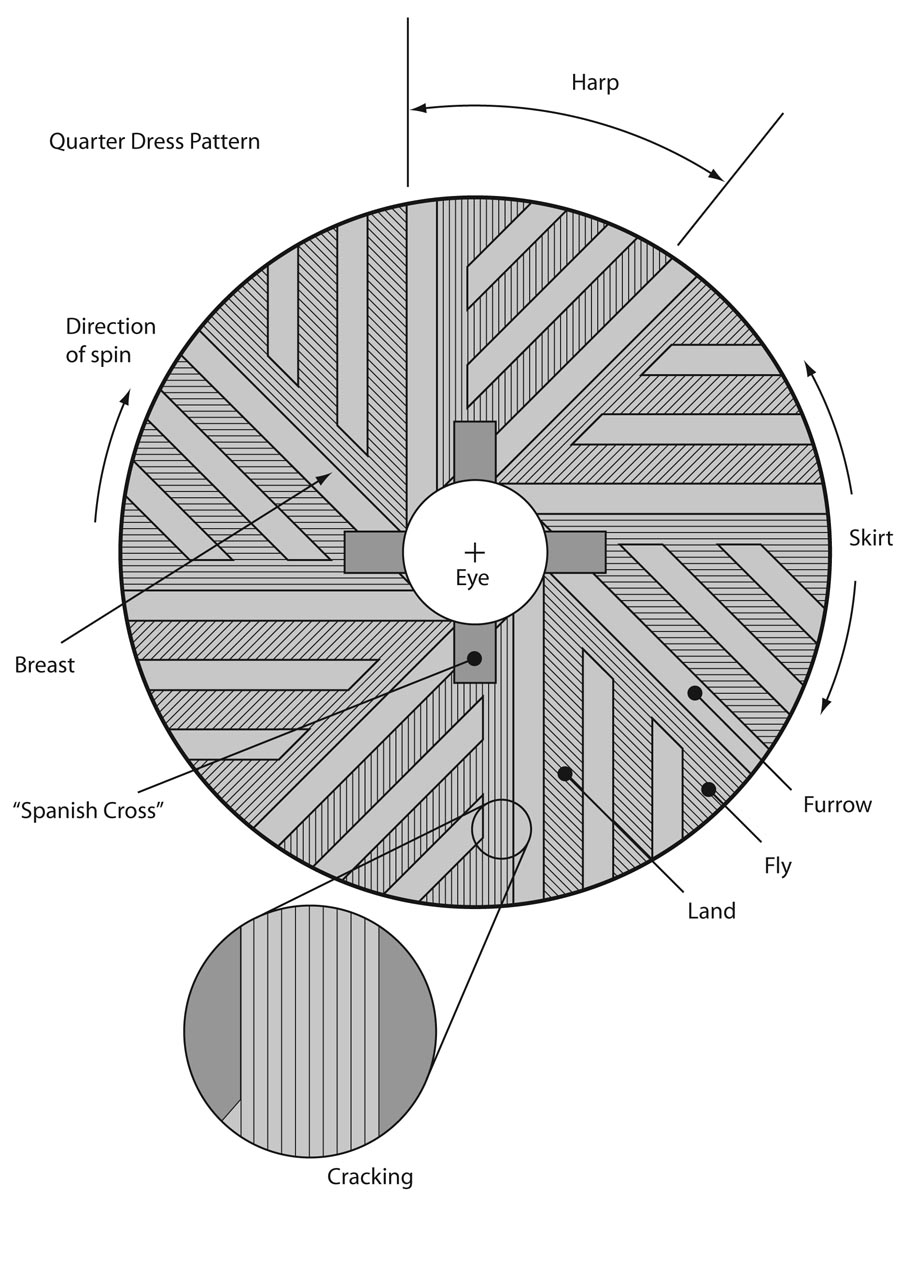
The basic anatomy of a millstone. Note that this is a runner stone. A bedstone would not have the "Spanish Cross" into which the supporting mill rind fits.

Thirlage was the feudal law by which the laird (lord) could force all those farmers living on his lands to bring their grain to his mill to be ground. Additionally they had to carry out repairs on the mill, maintain the lade and weir as well as conveying new millstones to the site. The width of some of the first roads was determined by the requirements of at least two people on either side of a millstone with a wooden axle called a 'mill-wand'.

The restrictions created by the laws of thirlage, despite many legal challenges, did not experience any real relaxation until the passing by Parliament of the Thirlage Act in 1799, which enabled thirled tenants to apply to pay an annual sum in corn or in money to escape their thirlage obligations, or, in some cases, pay a large lump sum to buy themselves out of it completely. After this time, many mills fell out of use as unsubsidised running costs and competition by other mills took their toll. This may explain why so many mills went out of use, as deduced from comparing Armstrong's 1775 map with the 1885 OS map.

For example, Lambroch Mill on Lambroughton Loch served the small Lambroughton farms and apart from stone rubble and some other indications, it has entirely vanished.

== The Museum of Country Life ==
The three-storey grain store has been converted during the main restoration period of 1985 to 1987, to house an extensive collection of Ayrshire farming and domestic memorabilia, reflecting the self-sufficiency of the pre-industrial rural community that was Dalgarven. Displays include the themes of ploughing, threshing, harvesting and the village smithy. A cafe provides snacks and meals.

== Views of the Museum and Mill ==
=== The River Garnock ===
For centuries the waters of the Garnock have supplied the motive power for the work of the mill. A weir and mill lade or race direct the waters to the mill's waterwheel.

=== The exterior of the mill ===
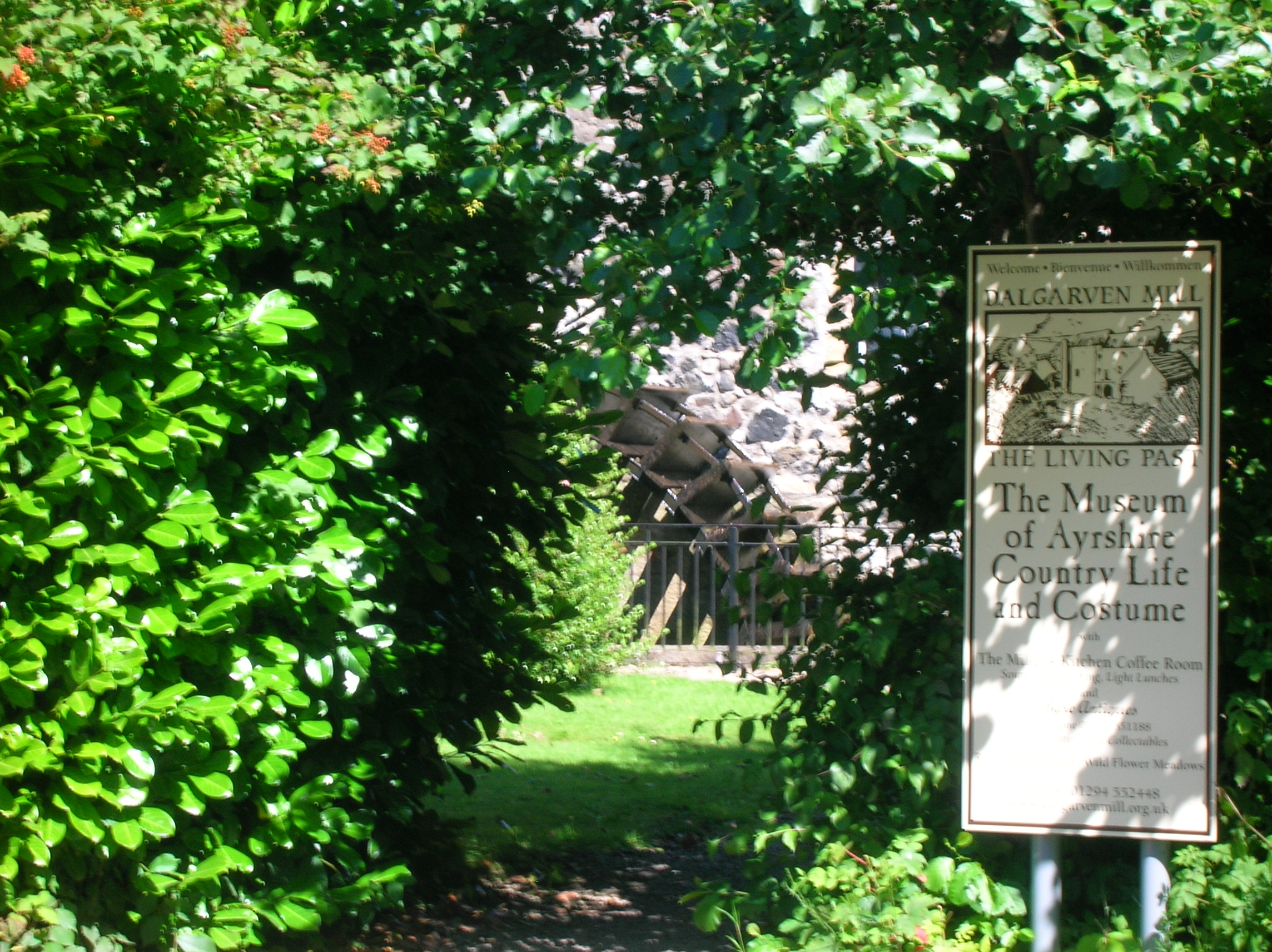
Welcome to Dalgarven Mill.

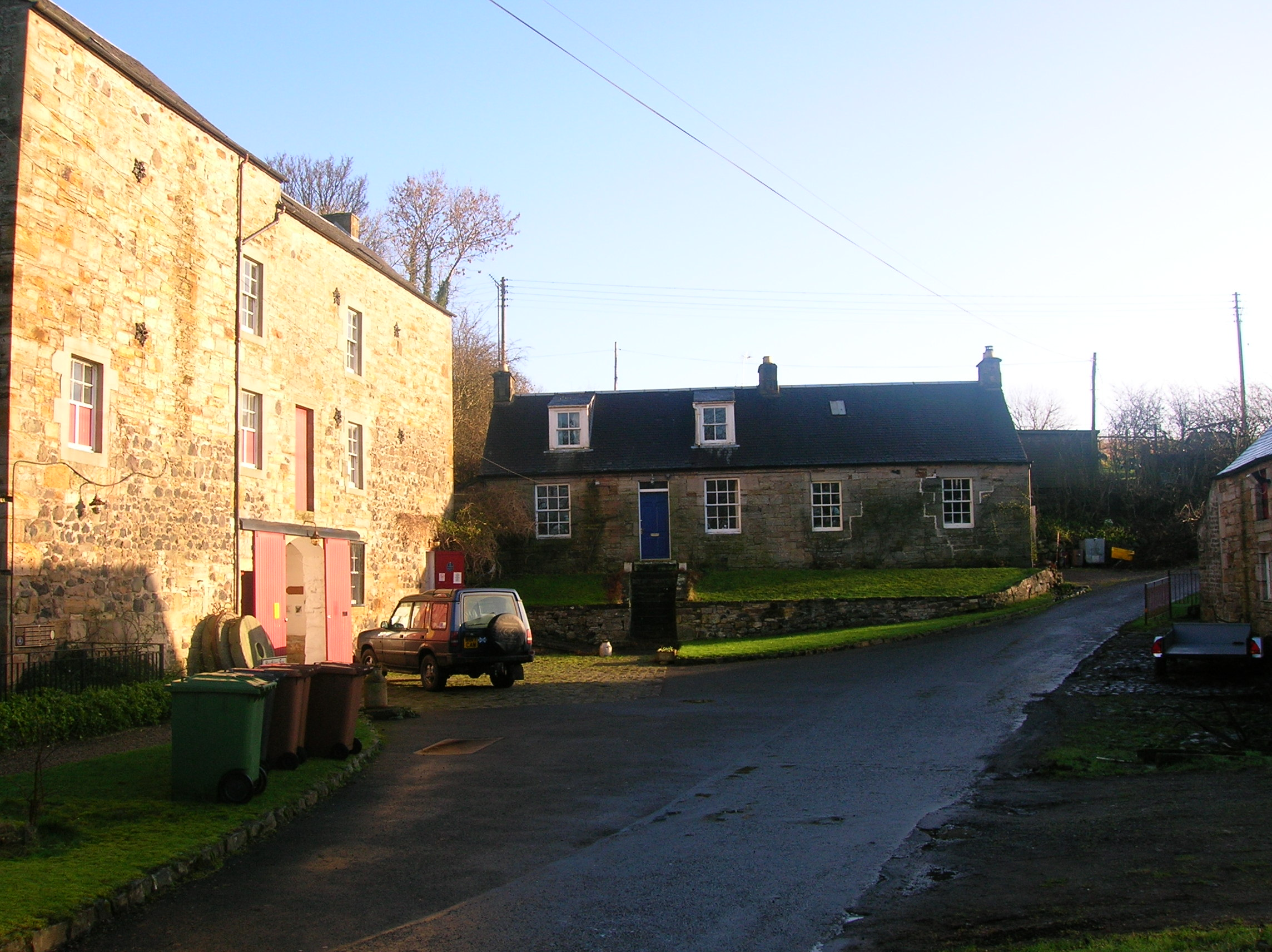
The front of Dalgarven Mill in 2007.

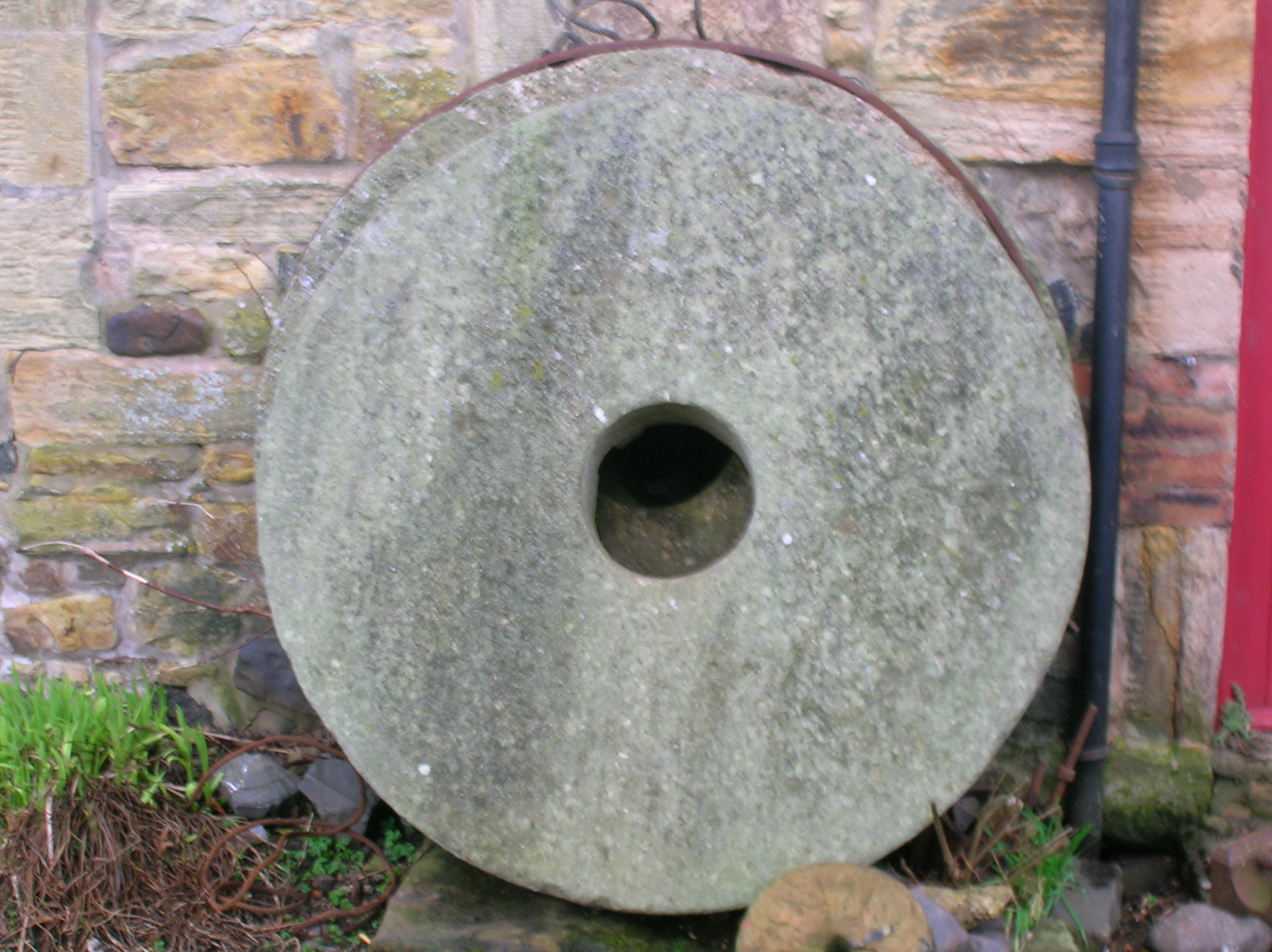
A Runner millstone.

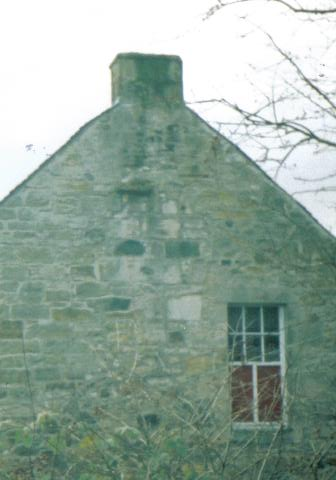
The Owl Hole and alighting platform at the back of the main mill building.

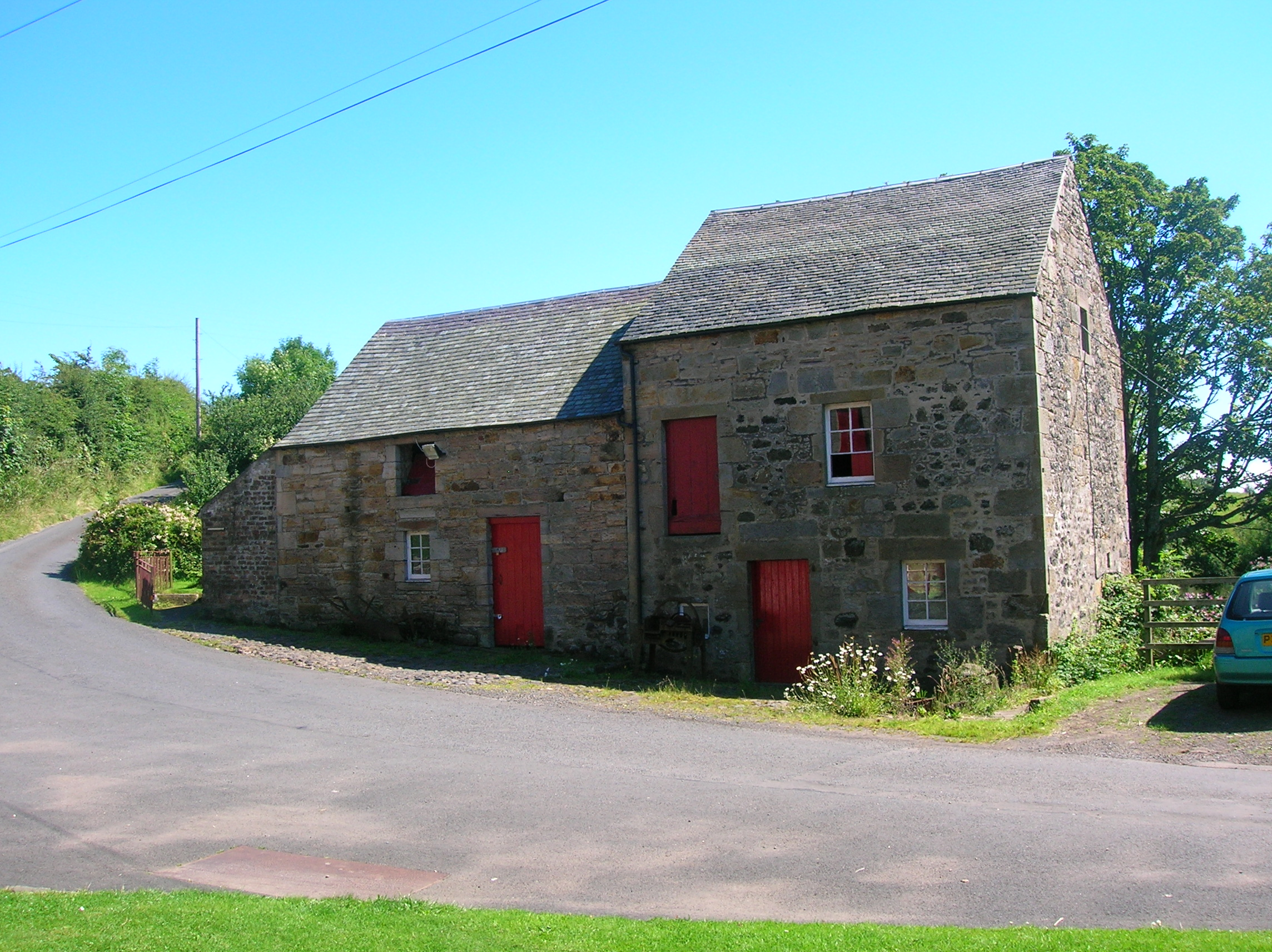
The 'old stables and waulk mill' buildings.

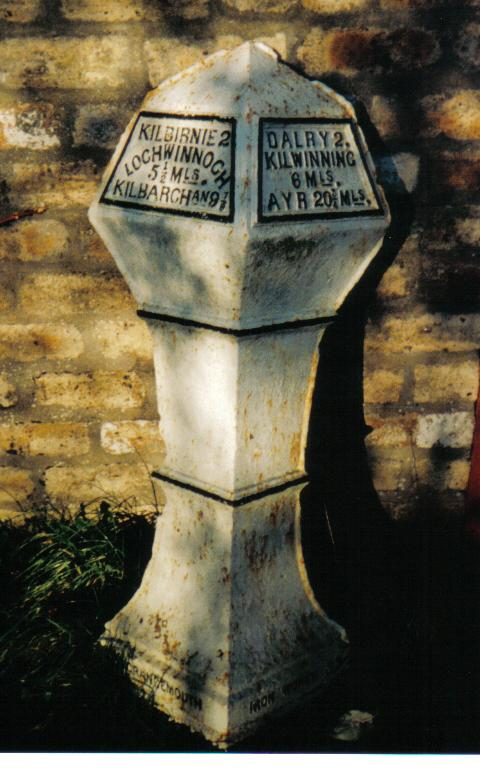
A cast-iron milestone at Dalgarven Mill.

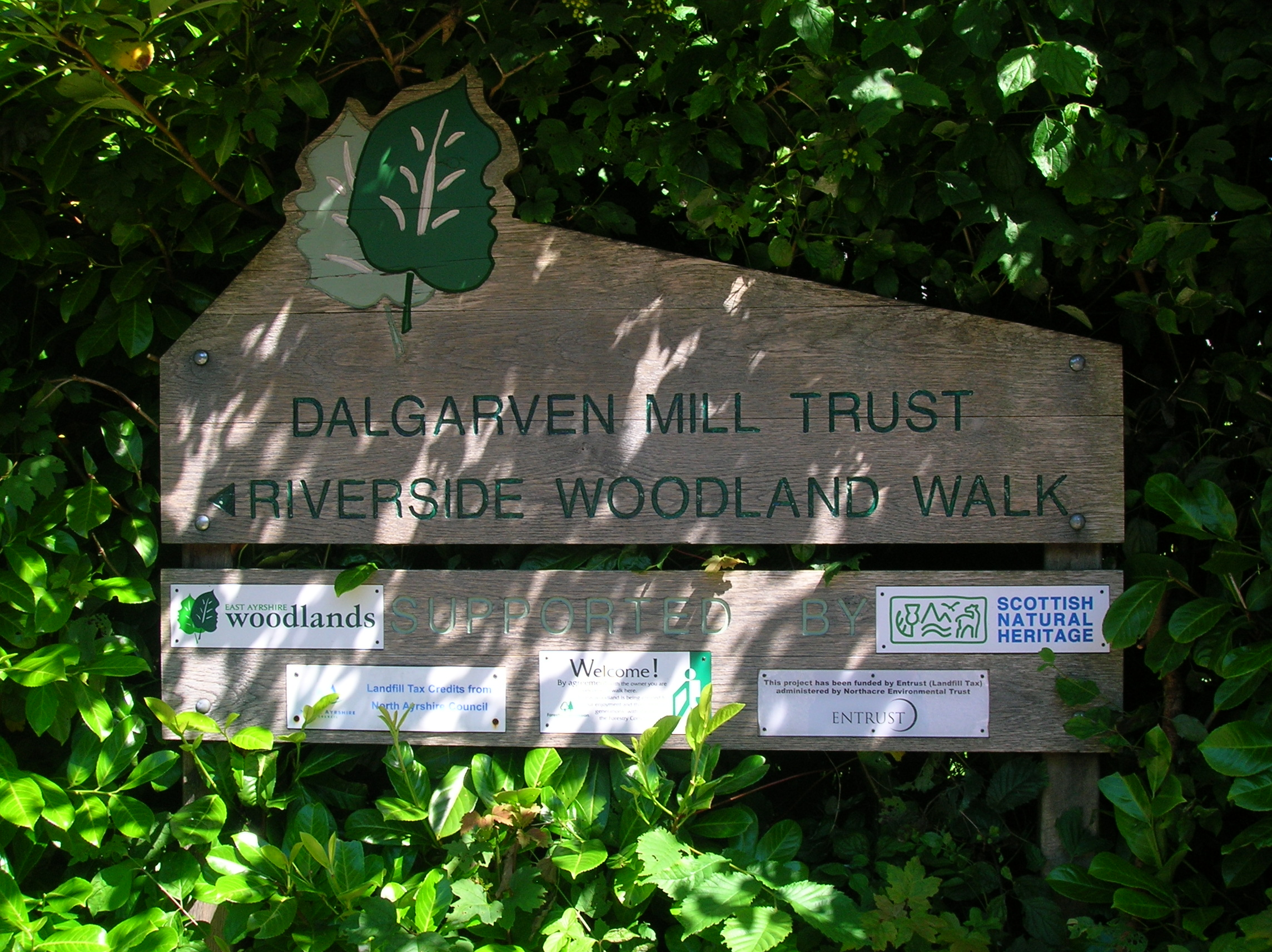
The Community woodland sign.

=== The interior of the mill ===
The interiors of the mill buildings have been entirely restored from the derelict condition that they had fallen into.

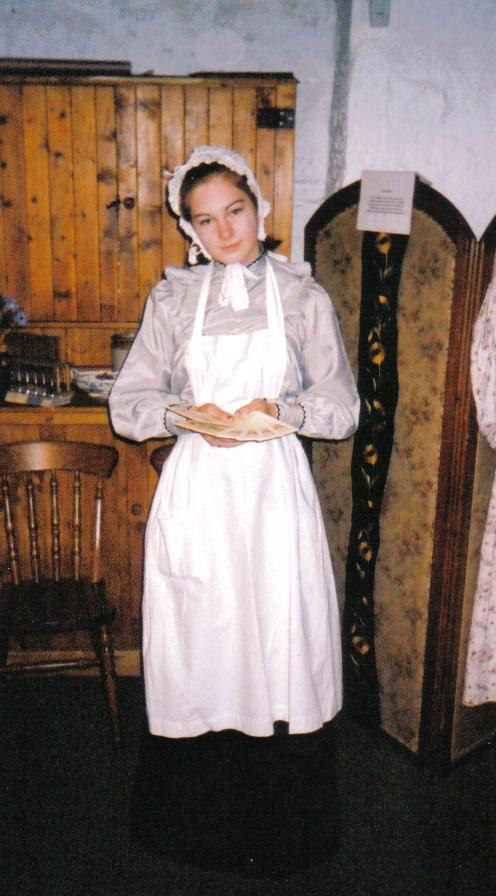
A Victorian servant on a mill open day

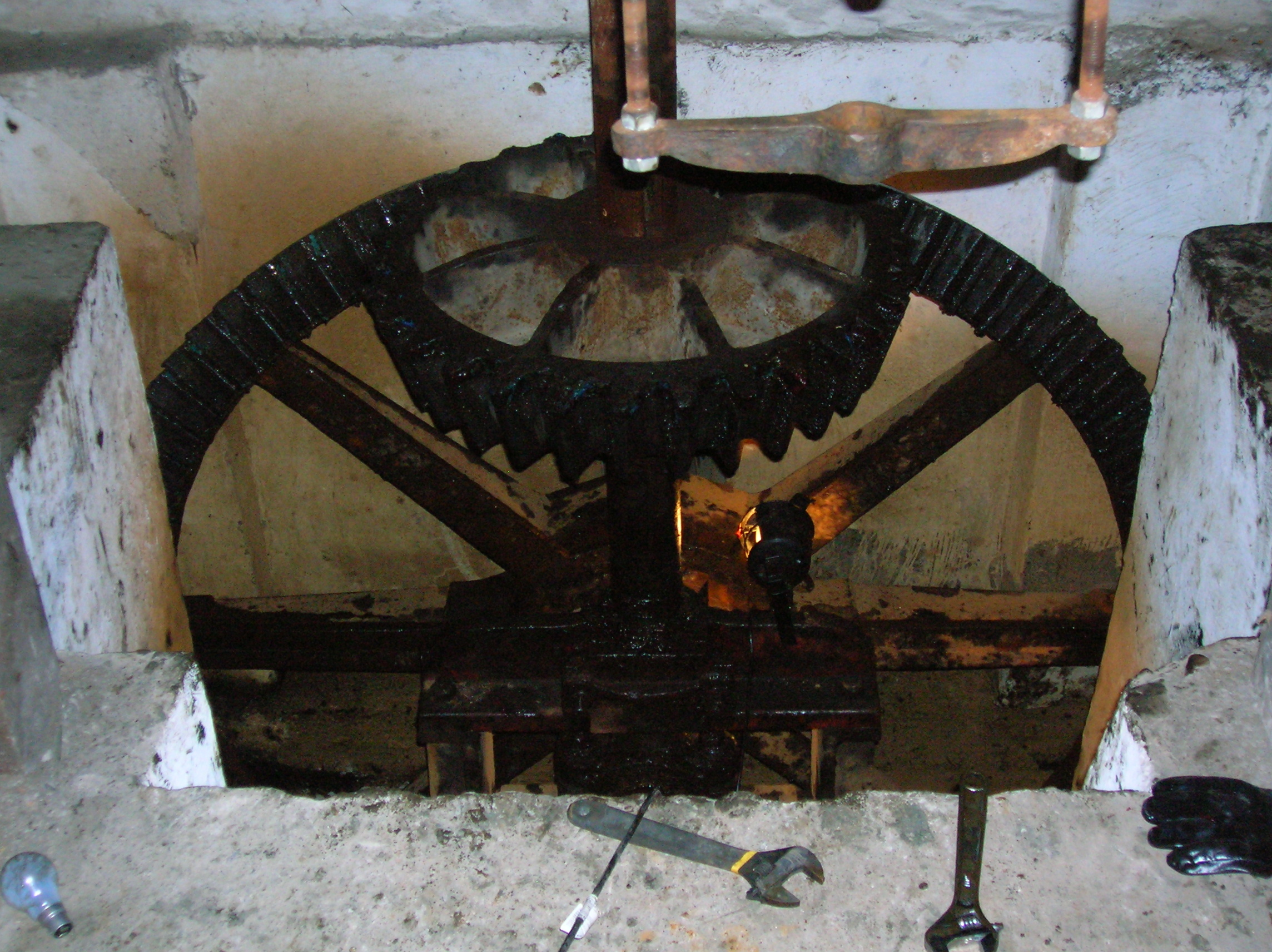
The waterwheel gearing

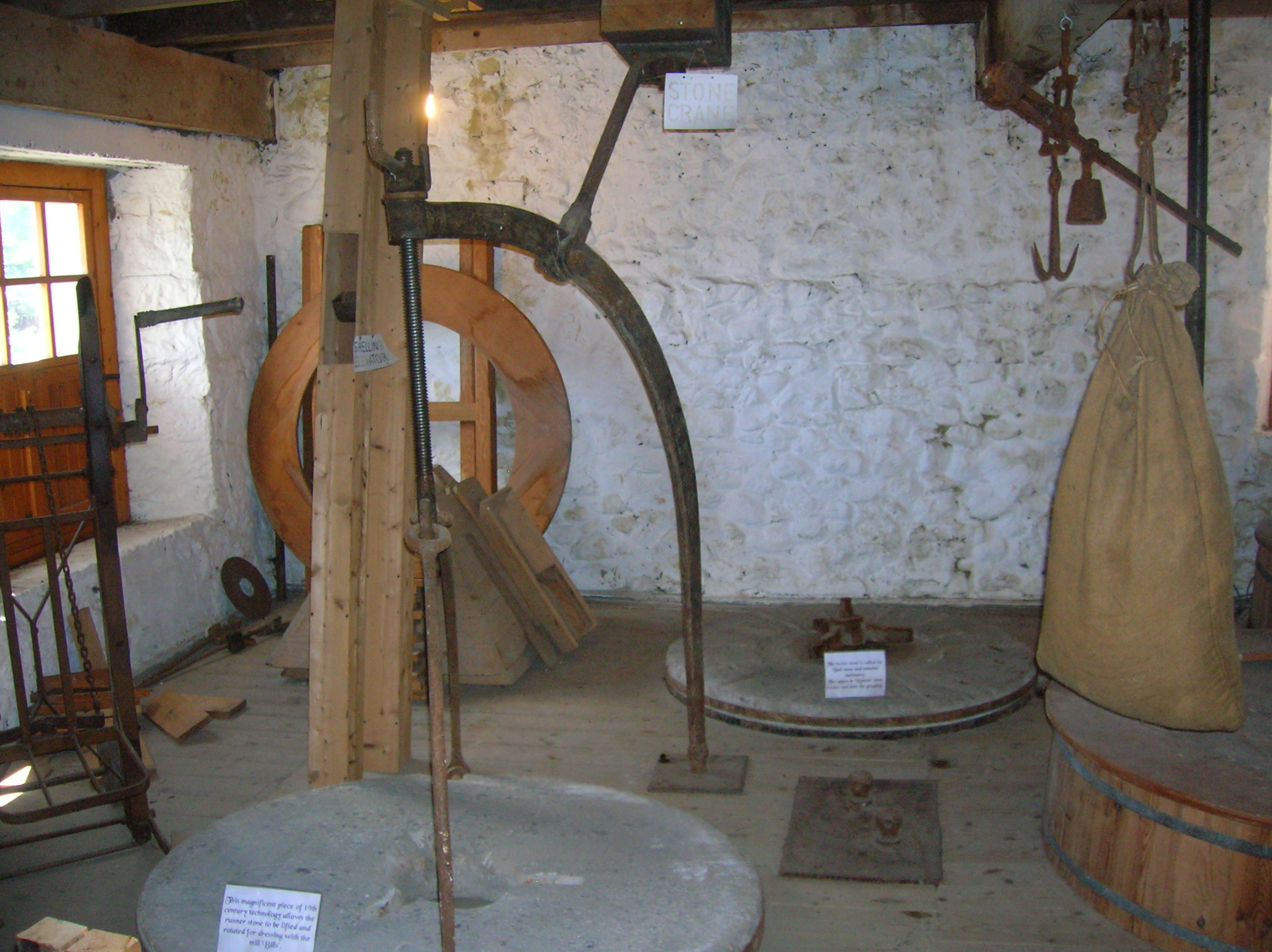
The millstones floor, with the 'hoist' for lifting the stones prior to dressing them

==== Exhibition areas ====
An upper floor of the mill is divided up into separate areas that recreate Victorian scenes from middle and working class houses.

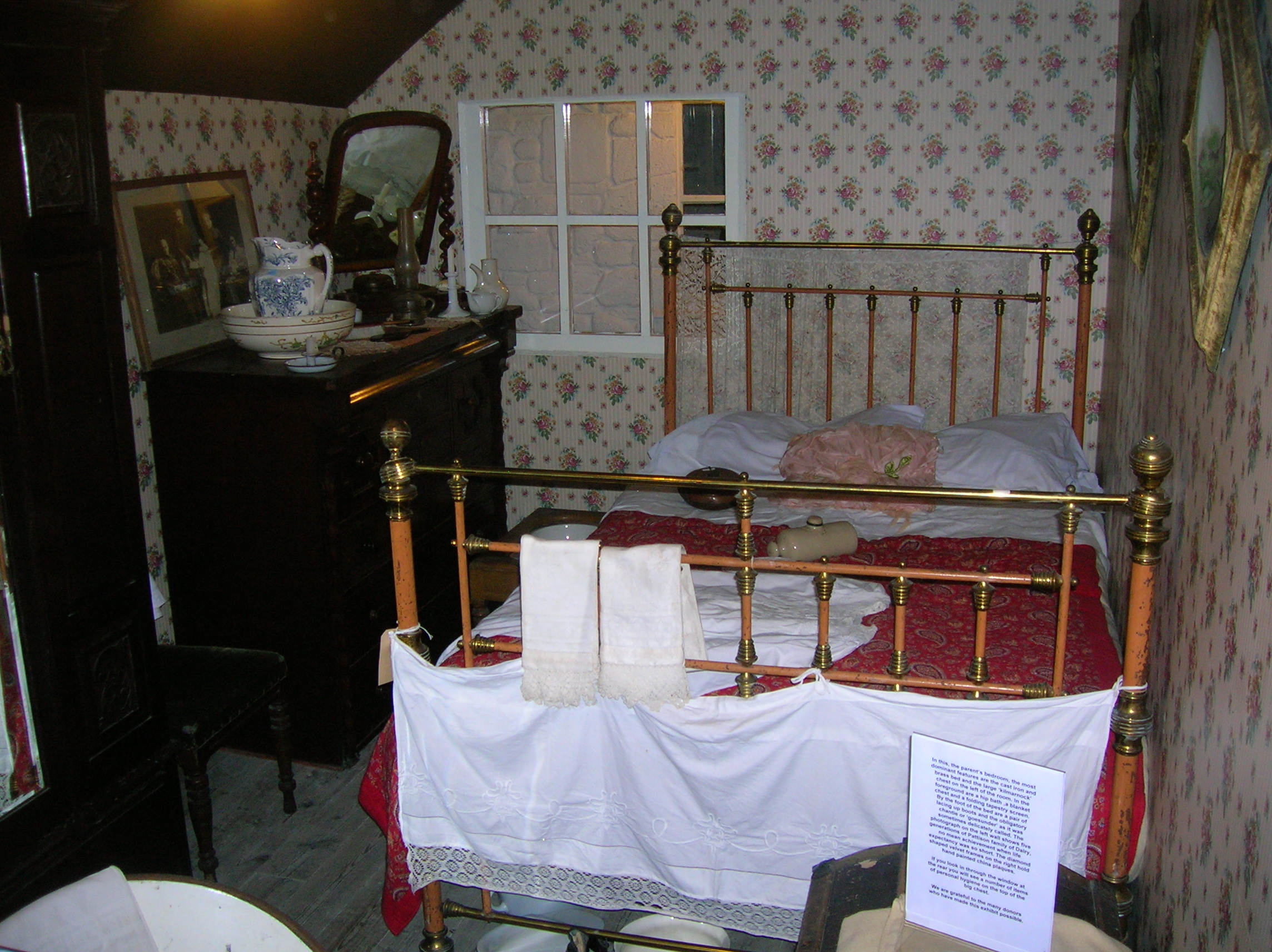
The Victorian Bedroom

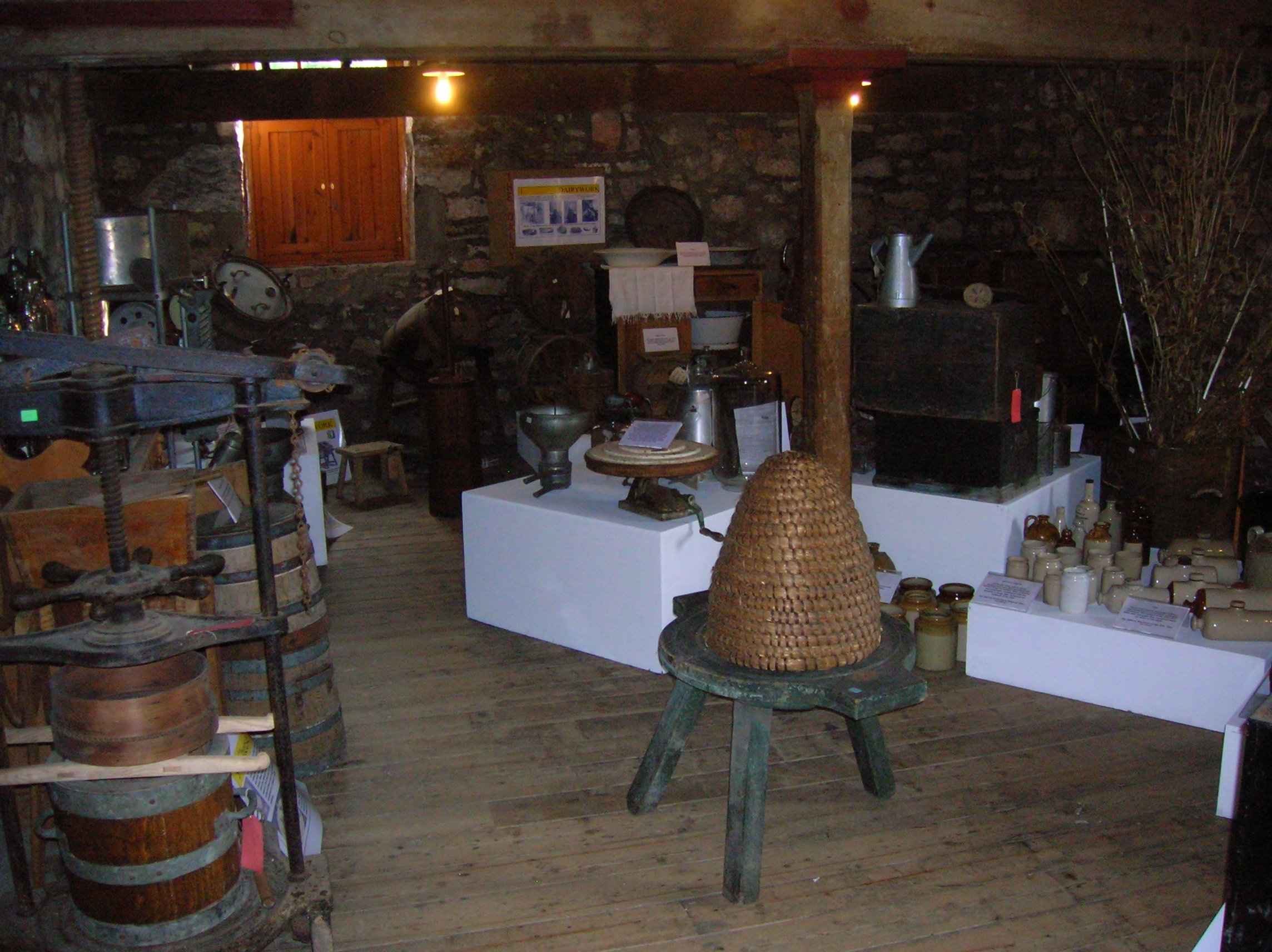
Dairy items, such as cheese and butter making, etc.

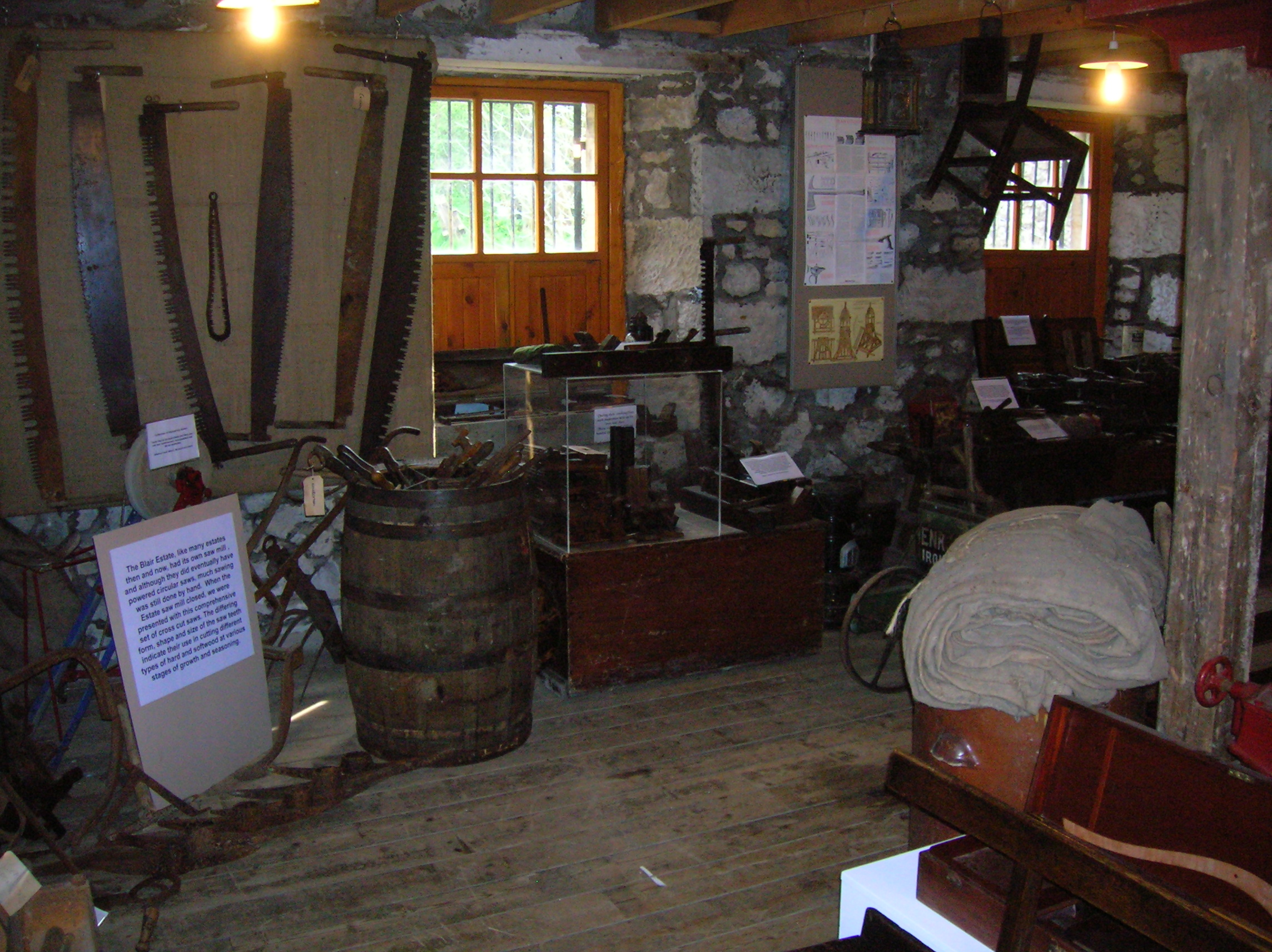
The Blair Estate sawmill

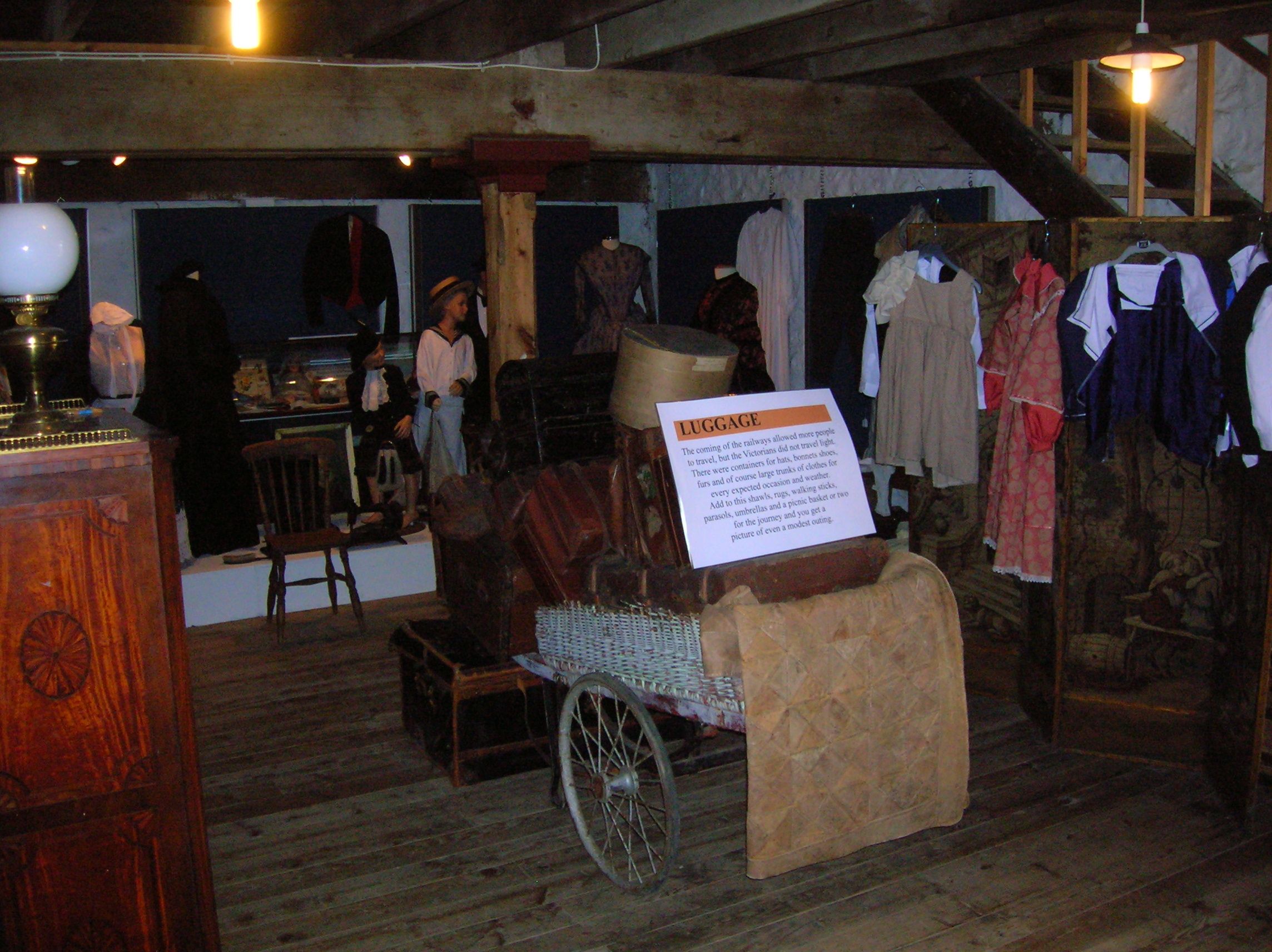
Luggage and travel in Victorian Britain

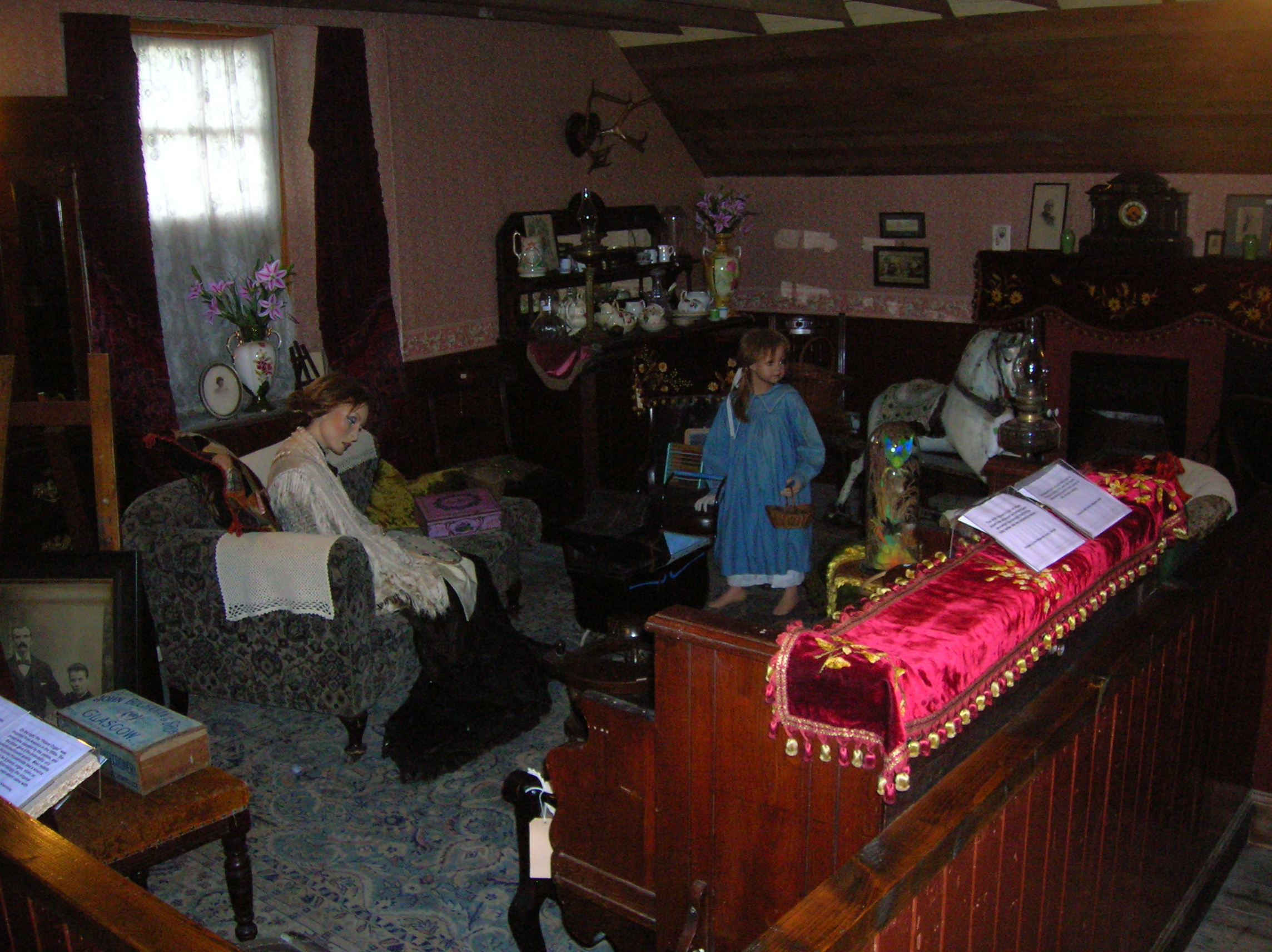
The Victorian miller's sitting room

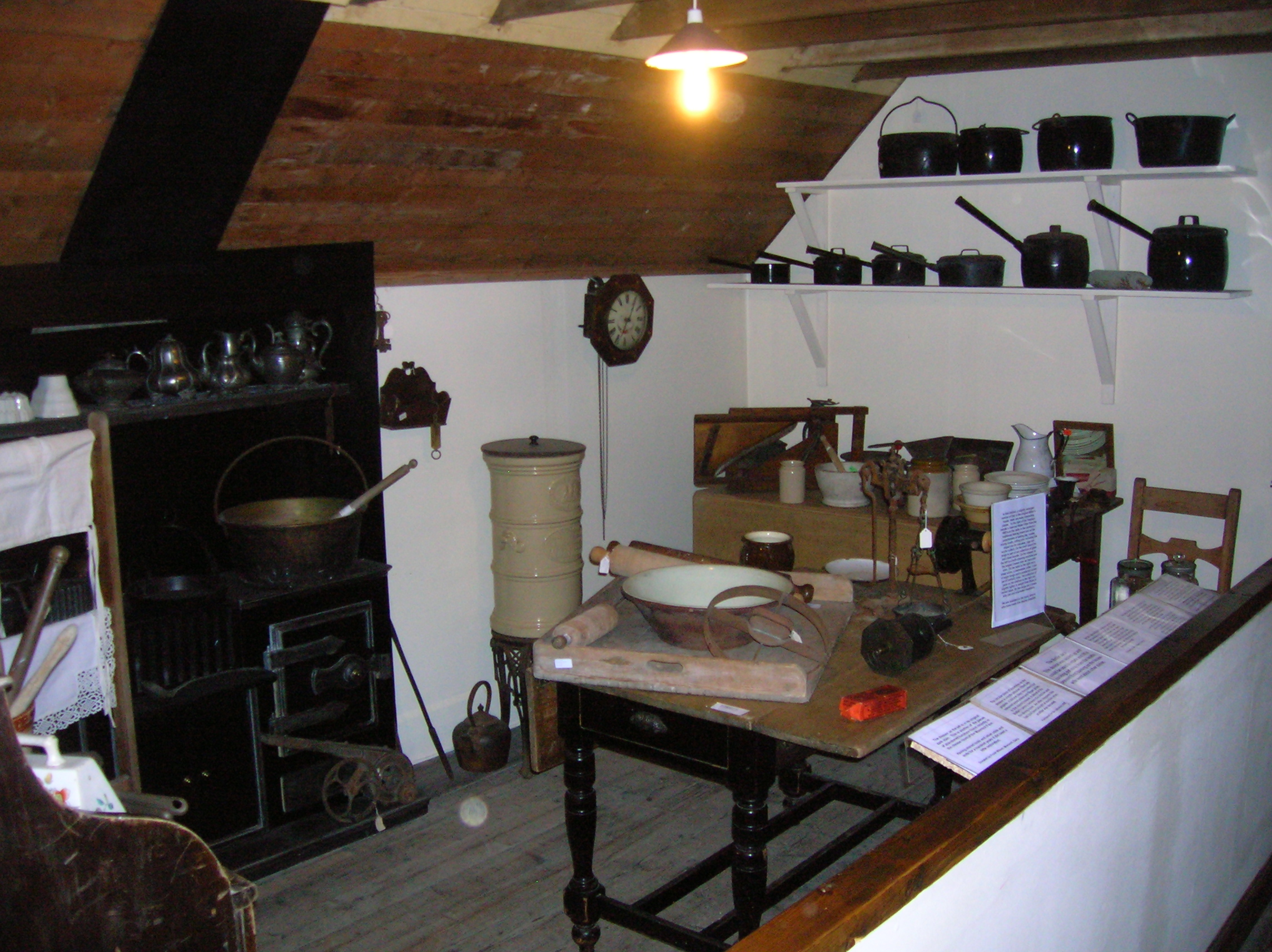
The Victorian kitchen

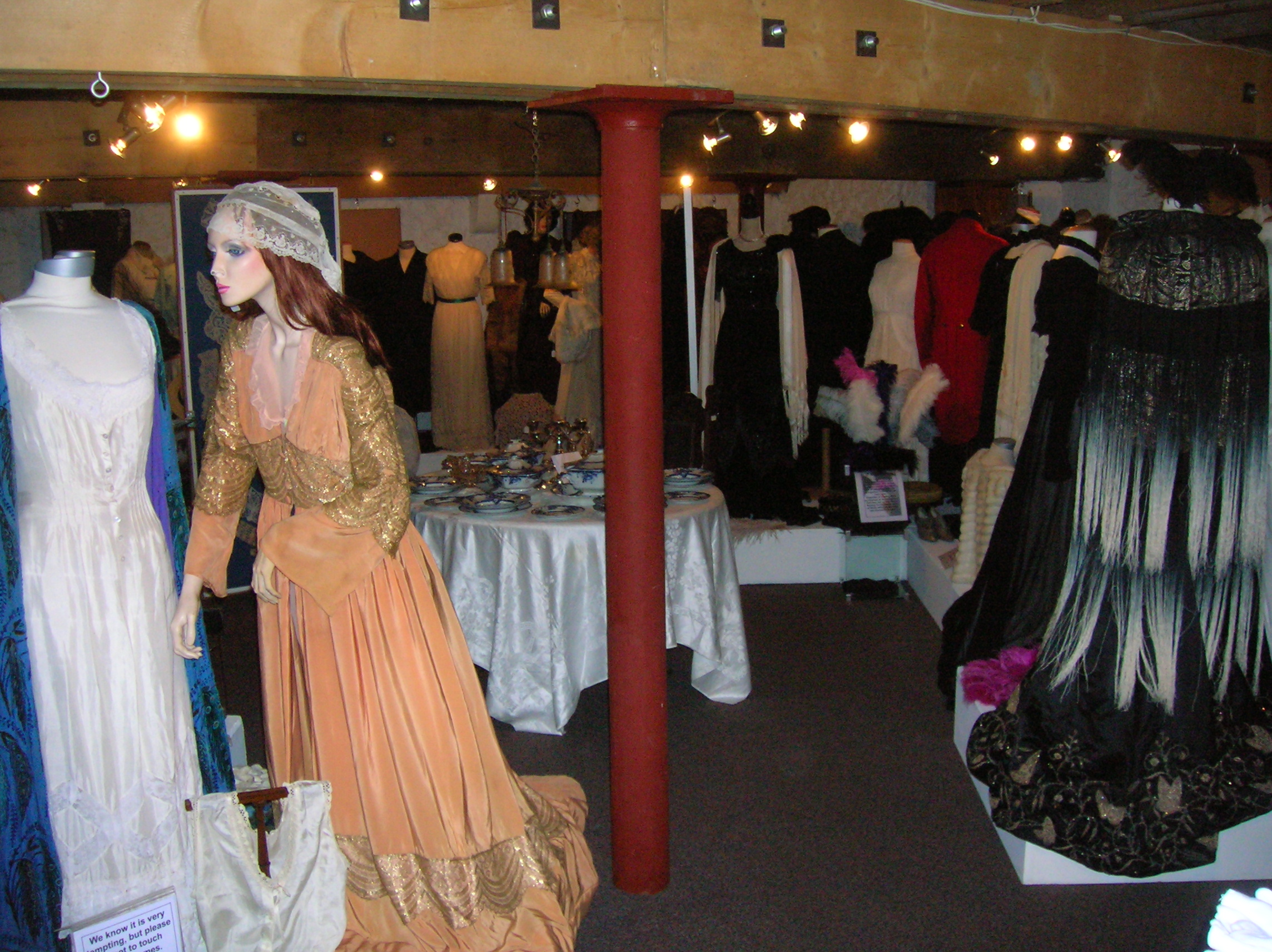
Costumes

=== Costume collection ===
The mill houses an extensive collection of costume and clothing from every walk of life. The exhibition area on the ground floor of the building is used to display items from the extensive collection. The exhibitions are changed regularly. The costume collection is put to other practical purposes, such as for educational visits, open days and other special purposes.

=== Country life in days gone by ===
A view of the working mill prior to WW2

The first and second floors of the mill show all the aspects of country life with re-constructions of interiors (parlour, kitchen and bedroom) from Victorian times and displays of farm implements, Ayrshire Whitework, lace, luggage, dairy work, wildlife, storage jars, a bee skep and stand, quoits, early vacuum cleaners, washing machines, blacksmiths' tools, etc. The single room in a cottars house has been re-created, complete with box-beds, girnal, swee and other features, such as the bible-chair.

On each floor the restored mill machinery is open to view (hoppers, grindstones, wheel gearing, etc.) and on the ground floor is an exhibition of the stages in the restoration of the mill. The exhibition shows the enormous amount of work that had to be done to bring the mill back to life.

In the grounds of the mill are a number of items of interest, such as a cast-iron milestone and various horse- and tractor-drawn ploughs, whin crushing stone, etc.

=== Education ===
School groups can visit the mill as part of their studies and are given guided tours and / or specific talks on the many topics which are covered by the trust's collections. The riverside walk provides many opportunities for various studies, such as river life, wildflower meadows, biodiversity, geography, geology, etc. The water wheel gives a focus for studying sustainability.

== Other features of interest ==
=== Cup and ring mark stone ===
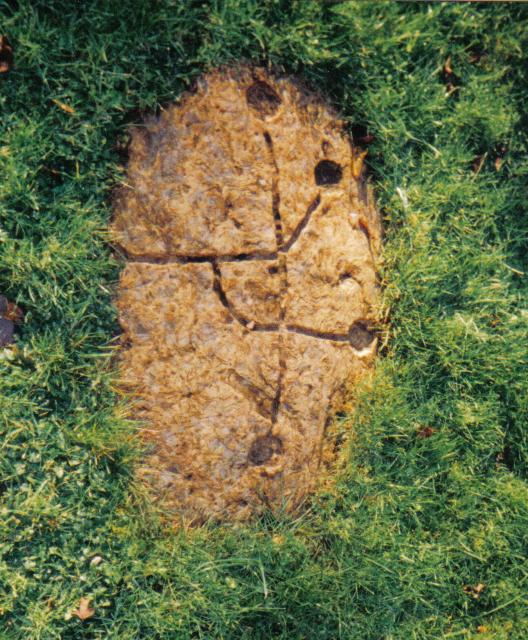
The Dalgarven Mill cup and ring mark stone.

A type of petroglyph called a cup and ring mark stone is recorded as existing at Dalgarven by John Smith, the notable Ayrshire antiquarian. Unfortunately the exact whereabouts of the stone is unknown; however a copy has been produced and is on display in the grounds of the mill. The purpose of cup and ring marked stones is unknown. The carvings on the original stone would have dated from the Neolithic or Bronze Age times, being as old as 6000 years. This Dalgarven example is unusual in having cups and connecting toughs, but no rings. Often up to five concentric rings are found circling the central cup.

=== Fossils ===
Fossil-bearing limestone boulders are sometimes found in the river with fossilized tree fern roots and imprints of the trunk. These represent long-extinct plant species which grew to an impressive height compared to their modern relatives which only reach a few feet. Millions of years ago these plants thrived in a warm and hospitable climate and gave rise to much of the Scottish coal deposits.

=== Riverside walk ===
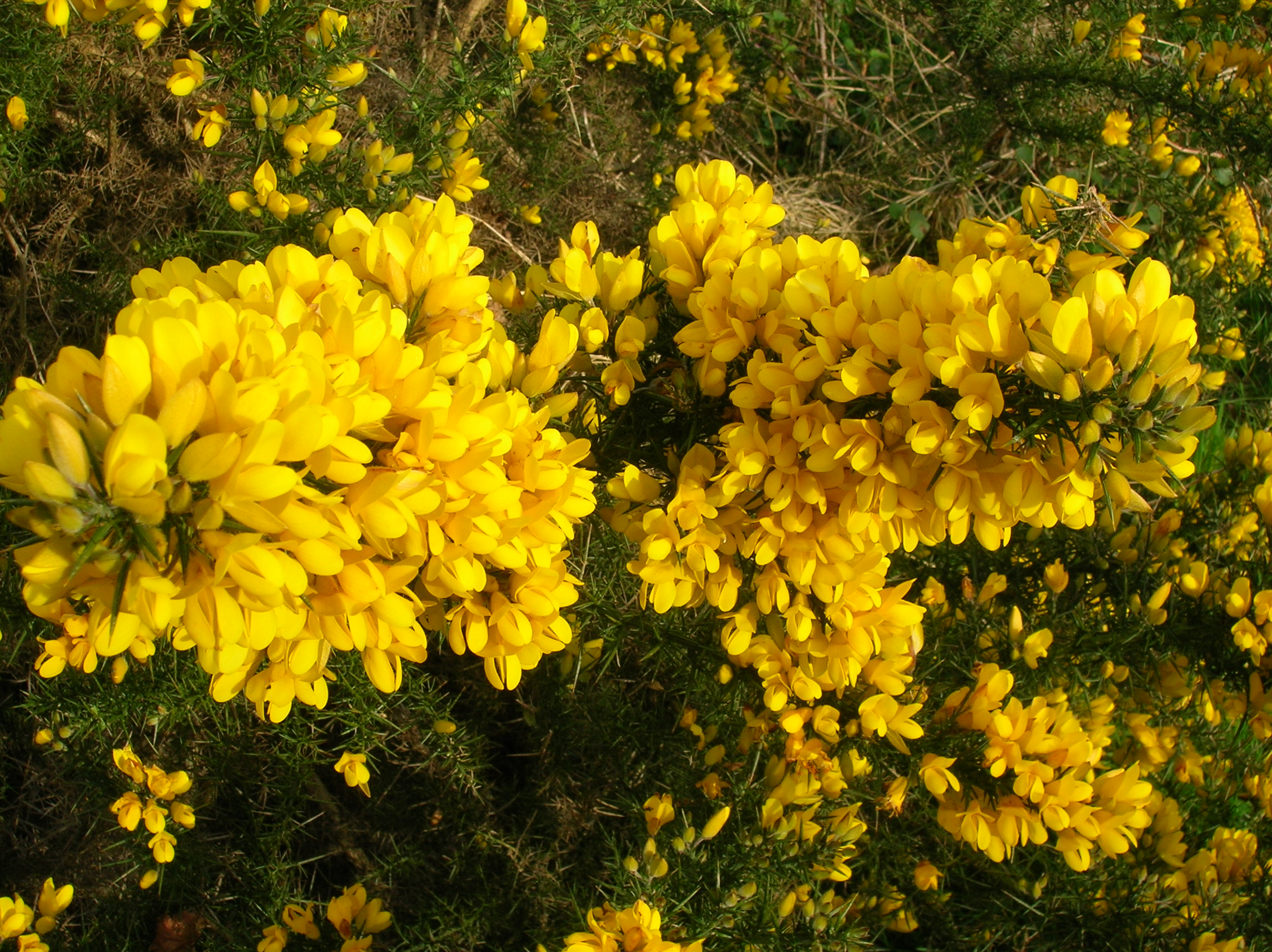
Gorse or Whin in full flower in Dalgarven Meadows.

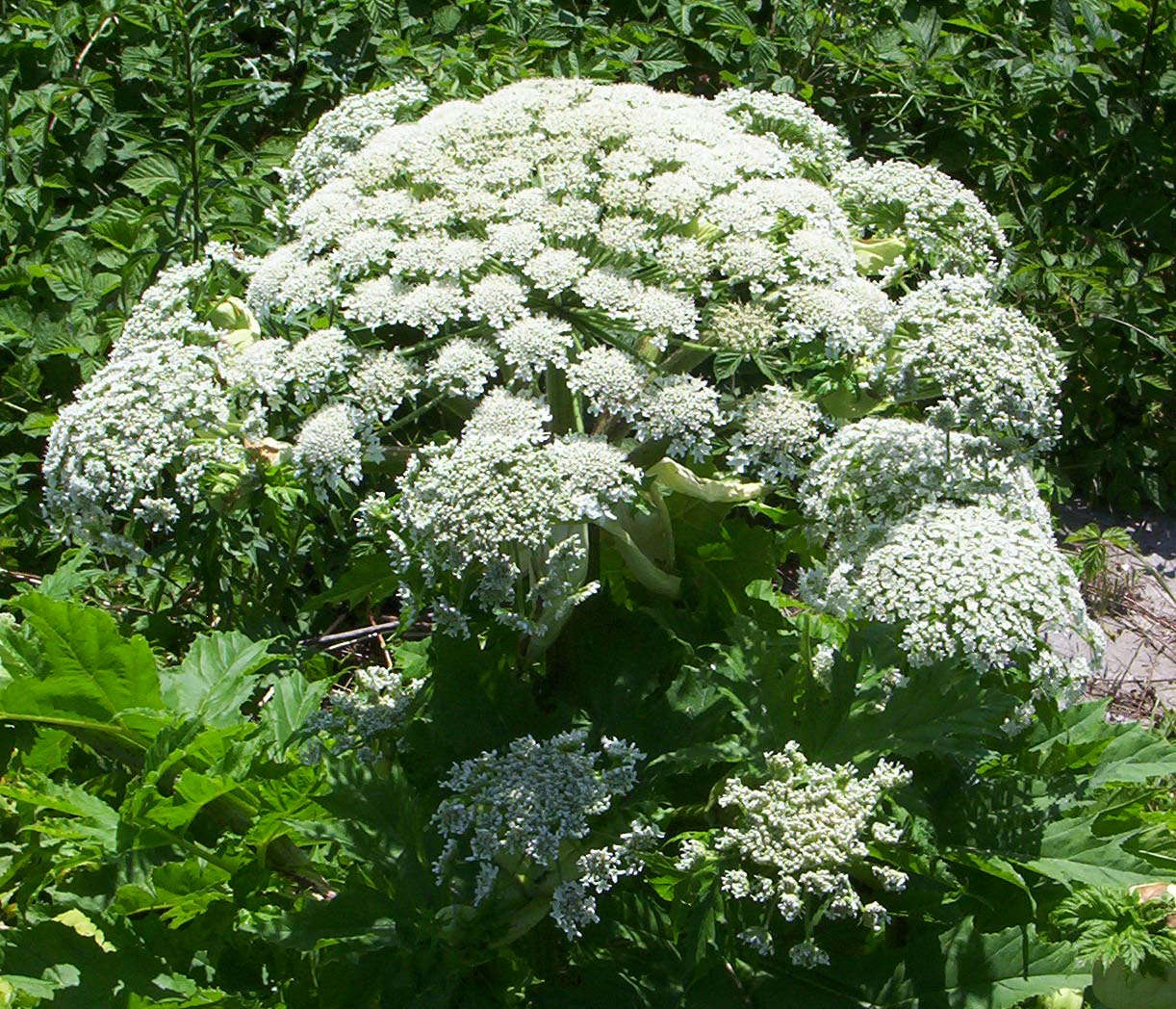
A Giant Hogweed flower in close-up. Do not touch!

Visitors should leave time to wander through the unspoilt landscape formed by the gently flowing River Garnock. In spring, the wild flower meadow is at its best, in summer, sit by the riverbank and watch the heron, swallows, kingfisher and other wildlife. A Community Woodland has been established and the site is open access.

The gravel bed of the river was an important source of income for the millers, for through the estate they had sole right to the extraction of the gravel here, which was sold for various farm and horticultural purposes.

The meadows are particularly rich in pignut (Conopodium majus), a relative of parsley, which formed a breaktime snack for children in former times. If the plant is dug up a small potato-like structure is found which when eaten raw has a slightly nutty taste. It is available commercially for salads, etc.

Hemlock water dropwort grows well in the wetter areas and is best left alone as the name hemlock suggests. The large leaves of the butterbur (Petasites hybridus) are found in several areas; its name harkens back to the days before clingfilm or cheap paper when the leaves were used to wrap butter destined for the market. Water ragwort (or Saracen's ragwort) (a species of Senecio) is an introduced plant which grows along the riverside in tall stands. It is common on the Garnock and at present quite rare elsewhere. Himalayan balsam or policemen's helmets is another introduction, but a common one. Giant hogweed is beginning to make its presence felt. It is another plant which should never be handled as the sap can cause severe blistering and scarring of the skin. Ayrshire Rivers Trust are a local conservation charity that have been highly effective controlling invasive weeds in Ayrshire and are soon to tackle giant hogweed on the Garnock and other rivers in North Ayrshire. More information on the work of the Trust is available through their website at www.ayrshireriverstrust.org

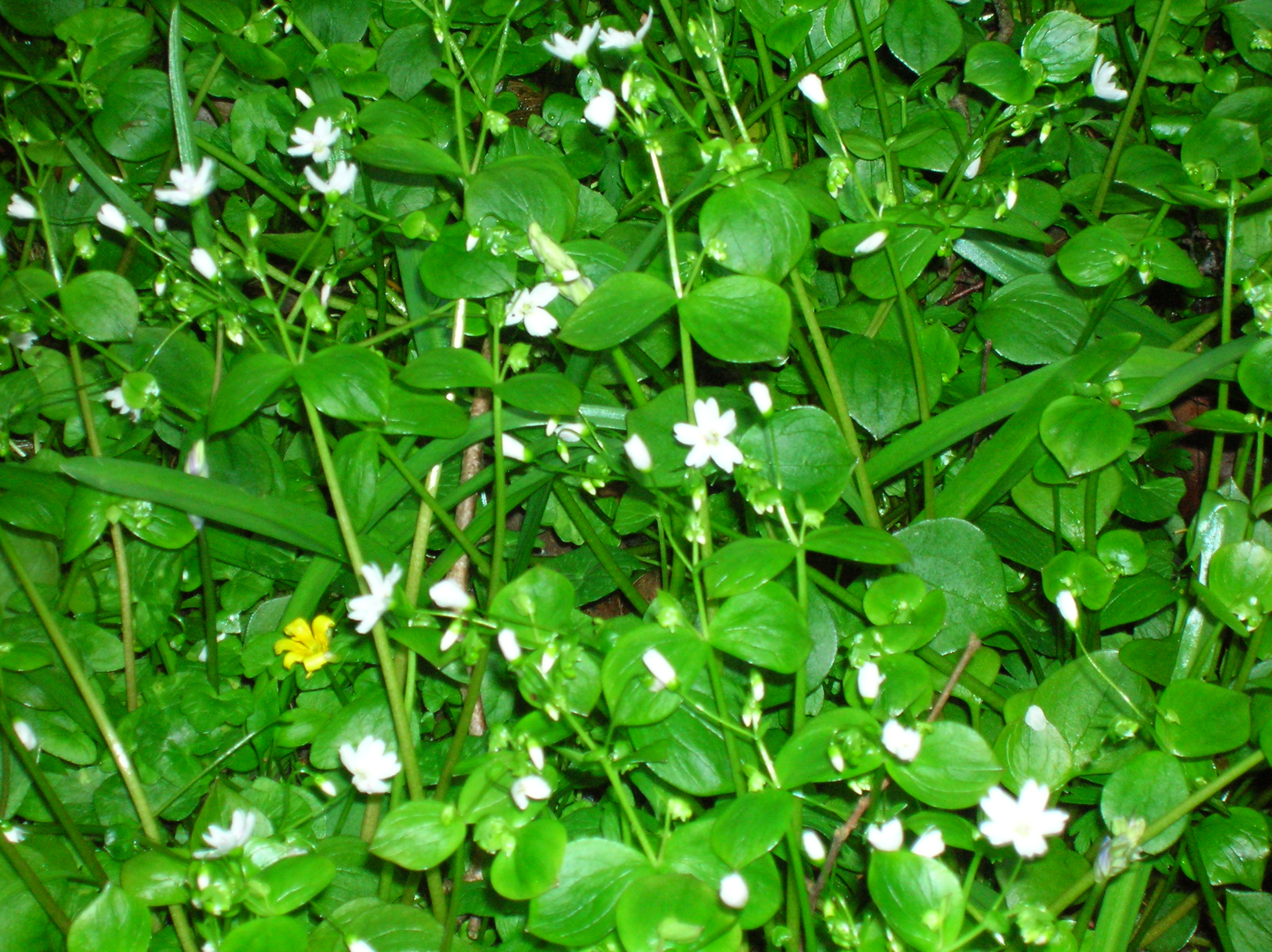
The Pink Purslane or Stewarton Flower.

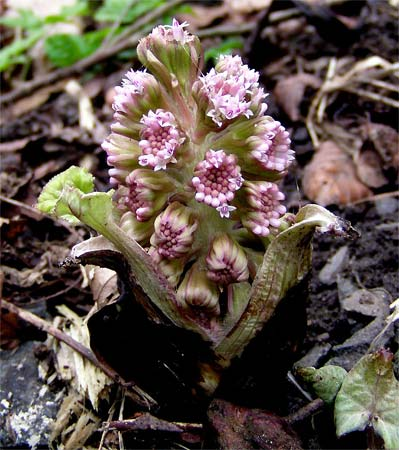
Butterbur in flower.

The Stewarton flower or pink purslane (Claytonia sibirica) is common in wetter areas. It has white or pink flowers at this site, but closer to Stewarton it is almost always white. It seems that it was first introduced as a white variety in the Stewarton area in Victorian times and the common pink variety, introduced later, spread to other areas. Dalgarven, it seems, is on the edge of the white flower zone of dominance. Dalgarven is the only known site for the pocket plum gall (Taphrina padi) which develops on bird cherry.

Coppicing of the riverside alder trees is still carried out. Alders grow well in wet soils and are specially adapted for the low nutrient conditions through having large root nodules containing nitrogen-fixing bacteria which enrich the soil in the same way as clover plants and other legumes.

The many hedgerow trees in the vicinity of the mill were not planted by farmers for 'visual effect', they were crops and the wood was used for building and fencing. The miller needed beech or hornbeam wood for mill machinery, in particular the cogs on the drive wheels from the waterwheel.

It is not generally appreciated how much the Ayrshire landscape has changed its character over the last few hundred years, for even in the 1760-70 Statistical Account it is stated that "there was no such thing to be seen as trees or hedges in the parish; all was naked and open".

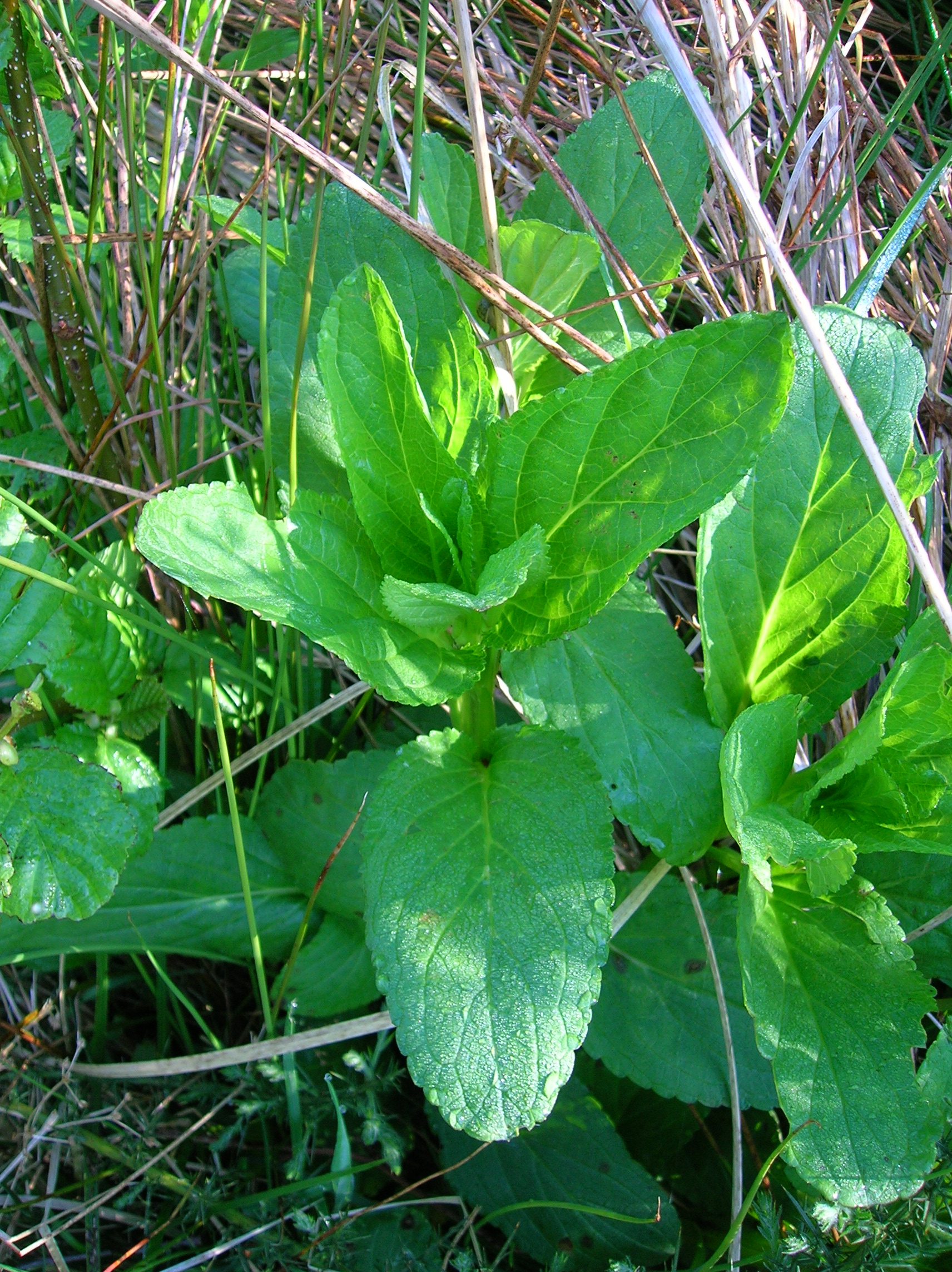
Water Betony or Green Figwort - the mill's rarest plant species.

=== Countryside walks and the Sustrans cyclepath ===
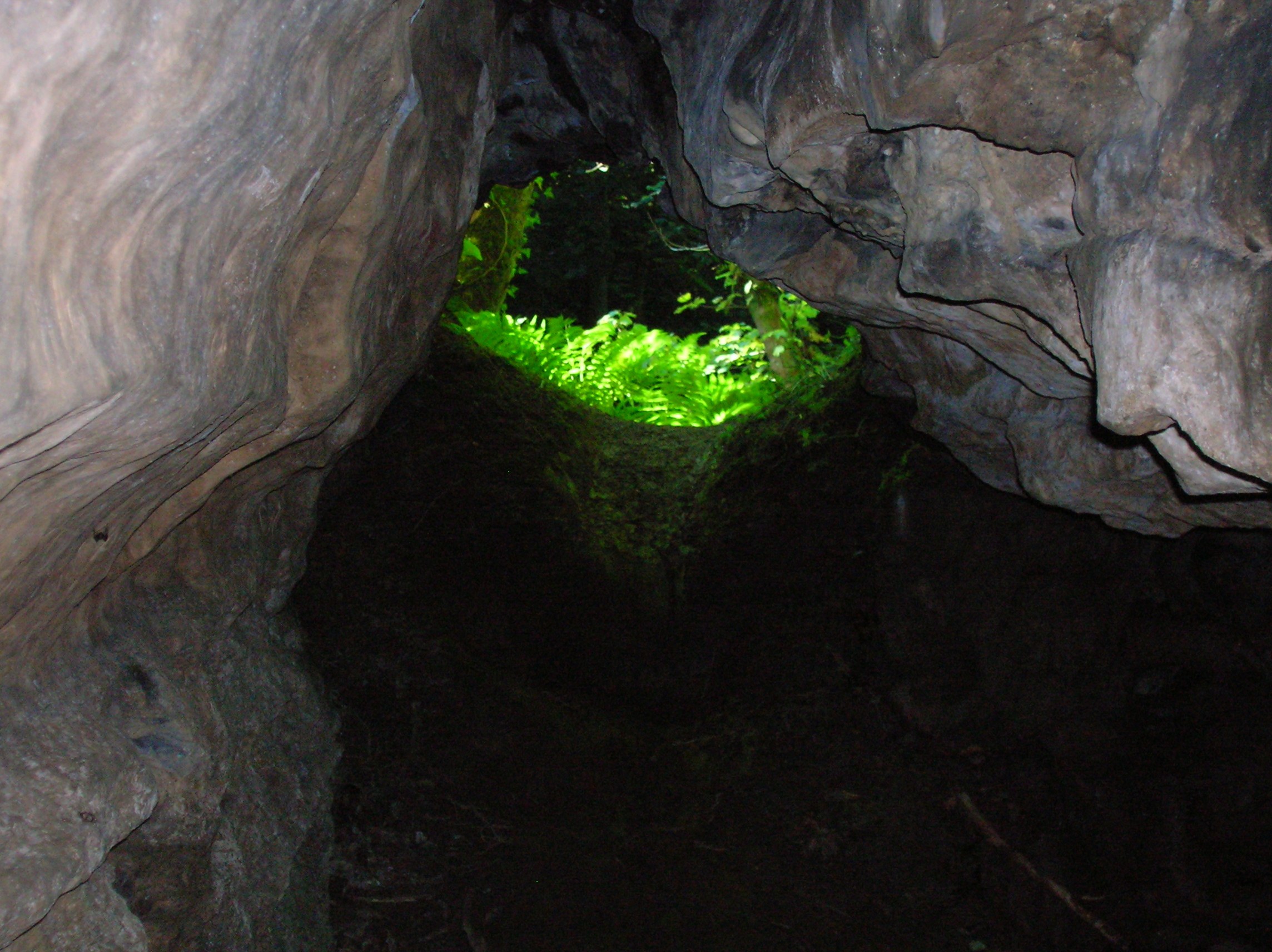
An entrance to Cleeve Cove Caves.

The Sustrans cyclepath from Irvine and Largs to Glasgow runs close nearby and cyclists often drop in for refreshment and a look around before heading up passed the Blair Estate and then along the old Lochwinnoch railway line via the Clyde Muirshiel Regional Park to Johnstone, Glasgow or Kilmacolm. The Dusk Water joins the Garnock at Dalgarven and one of Ayrshire's most interesting natural curiosities, Cleeves Cove cave system in the Dusk Glen, is within walking distance via Cockenzie and Auchenskeith farms.

=== Blair House ===
Until recently the home of the Borthwick family, Blair House, is nearby and had a long tradition of allowing public access to its grounds. It was said to be the house with the longest continuous occupation by the same family in Scotland until the family sold up in 2012.

== See also ==
- Nether Mill - Kilbirnie
- Ballochmyle cup and ring marks
- Barburgh Mill
- Coldstream Mill - Beith.
- Cunninghamhead Details of a series of mills on the Annick Water
- Meikle Millbank Mill
- Cup and ring mark
- Museum of Scottish Country Life
- Staddle stones
- A Researcher's Guide to Local History terminology
