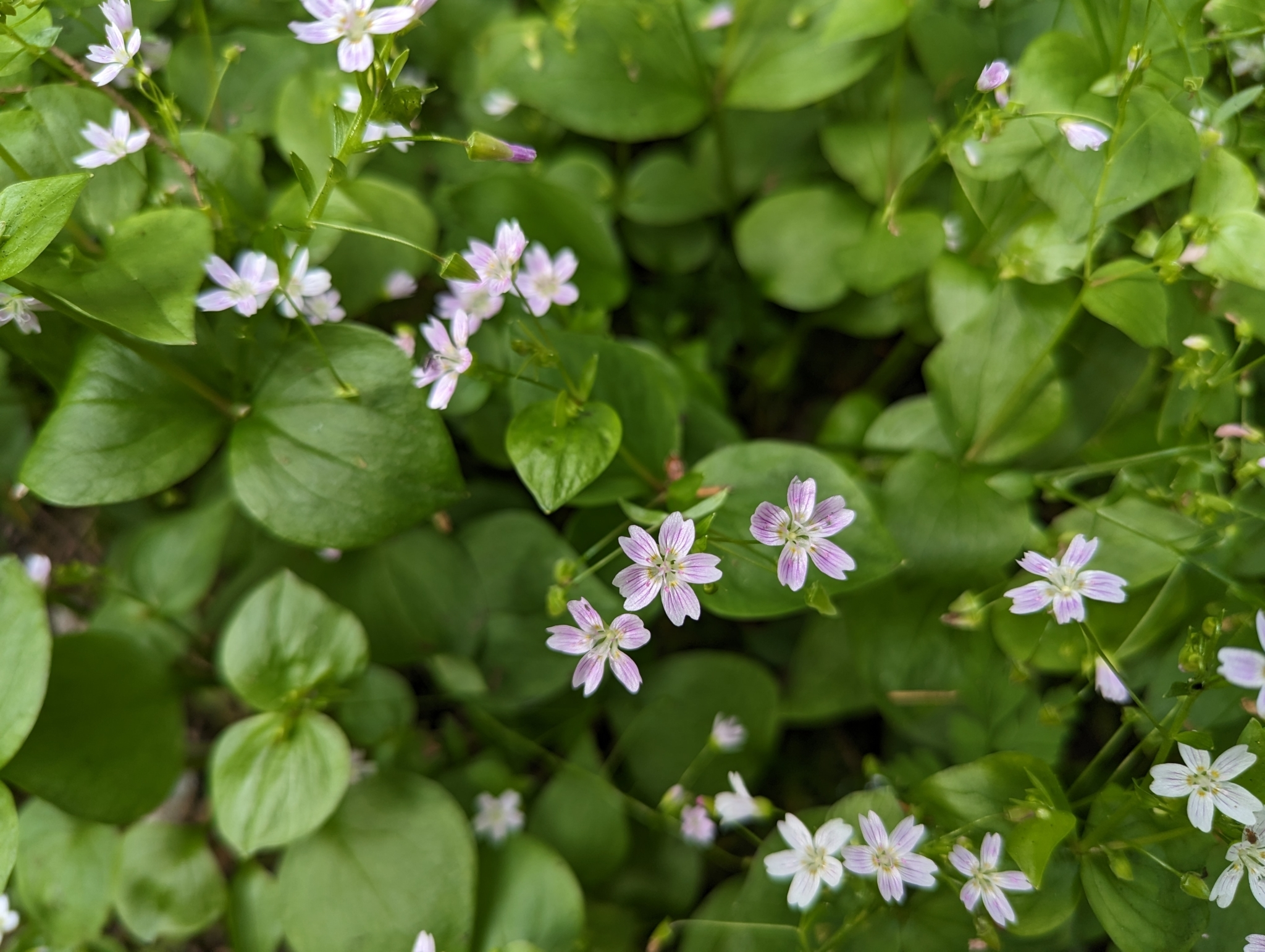

Scientific classification
- Kingdom: Plantae
- Clade: Embryophytes
- Clade: Tracheophytes
- Clade: Angiosperms
- Clade: Eudicots
- Order: Caryophyllales
- Family: Montiaceae
- Genus: Claytonia
- Species: C. sibirica

Binomial name
- Claytonia sibirica L.

= Claytonia sibirica =

Species of flowering plant

Claytonia sibirica is a flowering plant in the family Montiaceae, commonly known as pink purslane, candy flower, Siberian spring beauty or Siberian miner's lettuce. A synonym is Montia sibirica. It is native to Aleutian Islands and western North America and has been introduced into parts of Europe and Scandinavia.

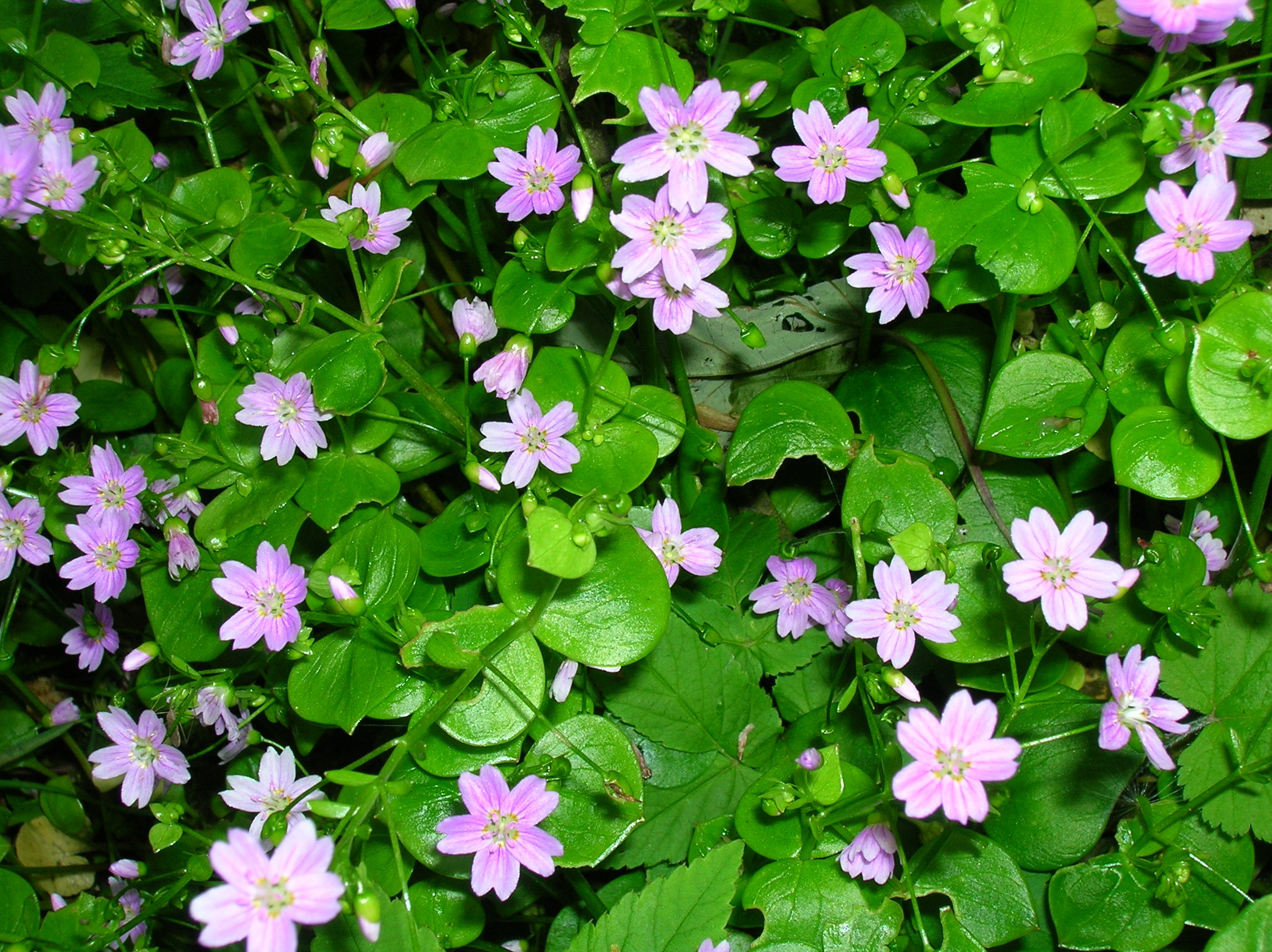
Pink purslane in full flower

== Habitat and description ==
It is found in moist woods. It is long-lived perennial, biennial, or annual with hermaphroditic flowers which are protandrous and self-fertile. The numerous fleshy stems form a rosette and the leaves are linear, lanceolate, or deltate. The flowers are 8–20 mm diameter, with five white, candy-striped, or pink petals; flowering is typically between February and August, but some plants continue to bloom late into autumn.

== Distribution ==
It is native to the Commander Islands (including Bering Island) of Siberia, and western North America from the Aleutian Islands and coastal Alaska south through Haida Gwaii, Vancouver Island, Cascade and Coast Ranges, to a southern limit in the Santa Cruz Mountains. Populations are also known from the Wallowa Mountains, Klamath Mountains, northern Idaho, and The Kootenai. The plant was introduced into the United Kingdom by the 18th century, where it has become very widespread.

=== Invasiveness ===
The species is now found in most of the UK, especially the west and north. It continues to spread but is not considered invasive. However, it is reported to cause local problems due to its growth timing. The fleshy leaves appear early in the season and then collapse and may suppress the growth of later species.

== Uses ==
Much like Claytonia perfoliata, the aboveground portion of the plant can be eaten raw or cooked. Some leaves have a poor taste or aftertaste.

== The Stewarton flower ==
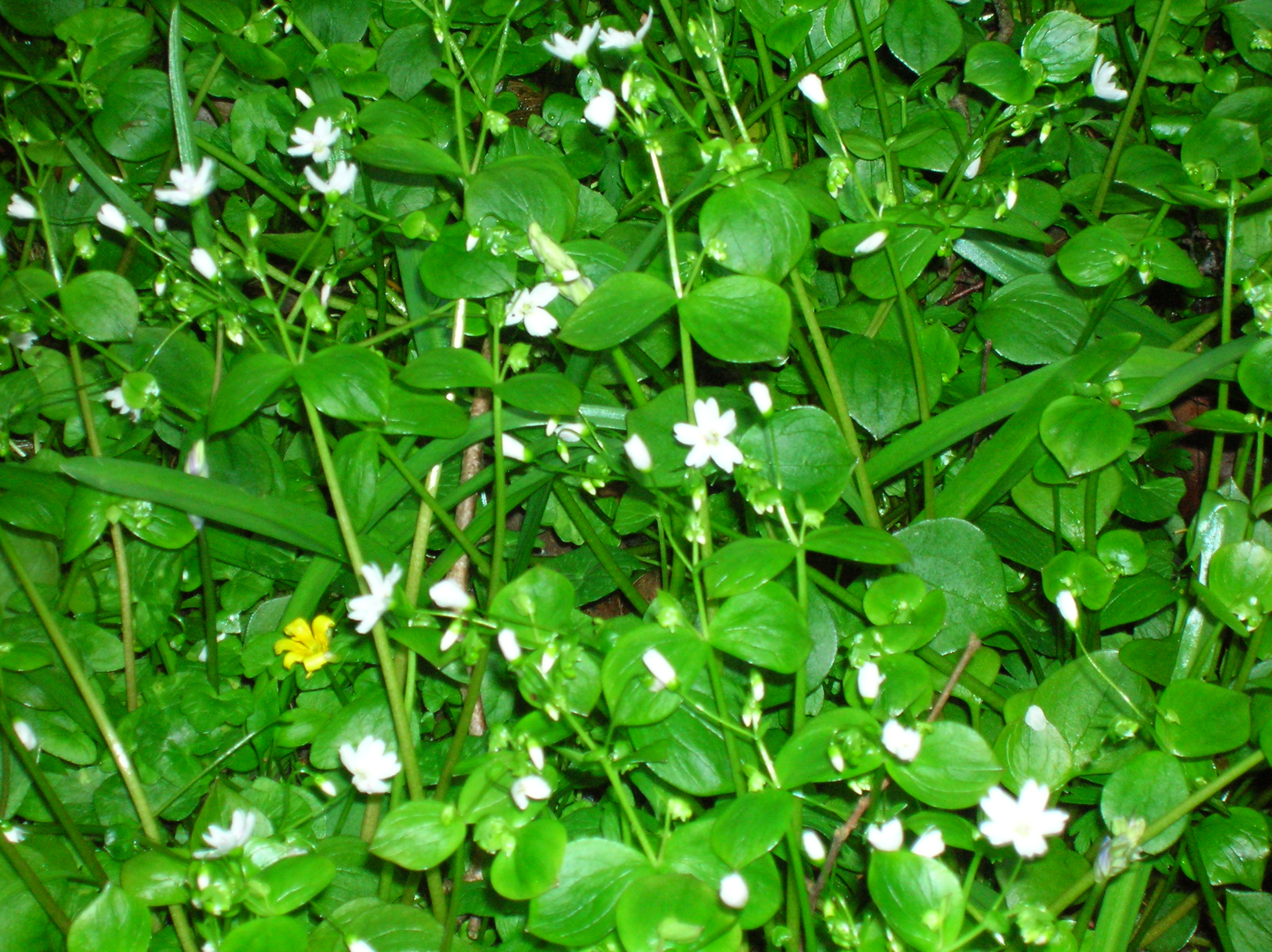
The pink purslane or 'Stewarton flower', the white form of which became established in the Stewarton area

An example of the variation found in Claytonia sibirica is the subspecies known as the Stewarton flower, so named due to its local abundance in that part of North Ayrshire, Scotland, and recorded as such by the Kilmarnock Glenfield Ramblers.

In 1915 it was stated to have been in the Stewarton area for over 60 years and was abundant on the Corsehill Burn. As the plant is very adept at reproducing by asexual plantlets, this has maintained the white variety's gene pool around Stewarton. The pink variety has not been able to predominate in Stewarton, and only occurs occasionally, unlike most other localities in Scotland.

The white variety predominates in Templeton Woods Dundee with occasional clumps of the pink variety.
