= The Kootenai =

Region of Montana state, US

The Kootenai is a region in the northwest of the US state of Montana encompassing the Cabinet Mountains and Lincoln County, Montana and the Kootenai National Forest (reference other Montana regions such as The Flathead and The Bitterroot). It is named after the Kootenai River. The name has been established as a social and economic development brand name by a Public-Private-Partnership between Lincoln County and the University of Montana.
