= Amisfield railway station =

Disused railway station in Amisfield, Scotland

Amisfield
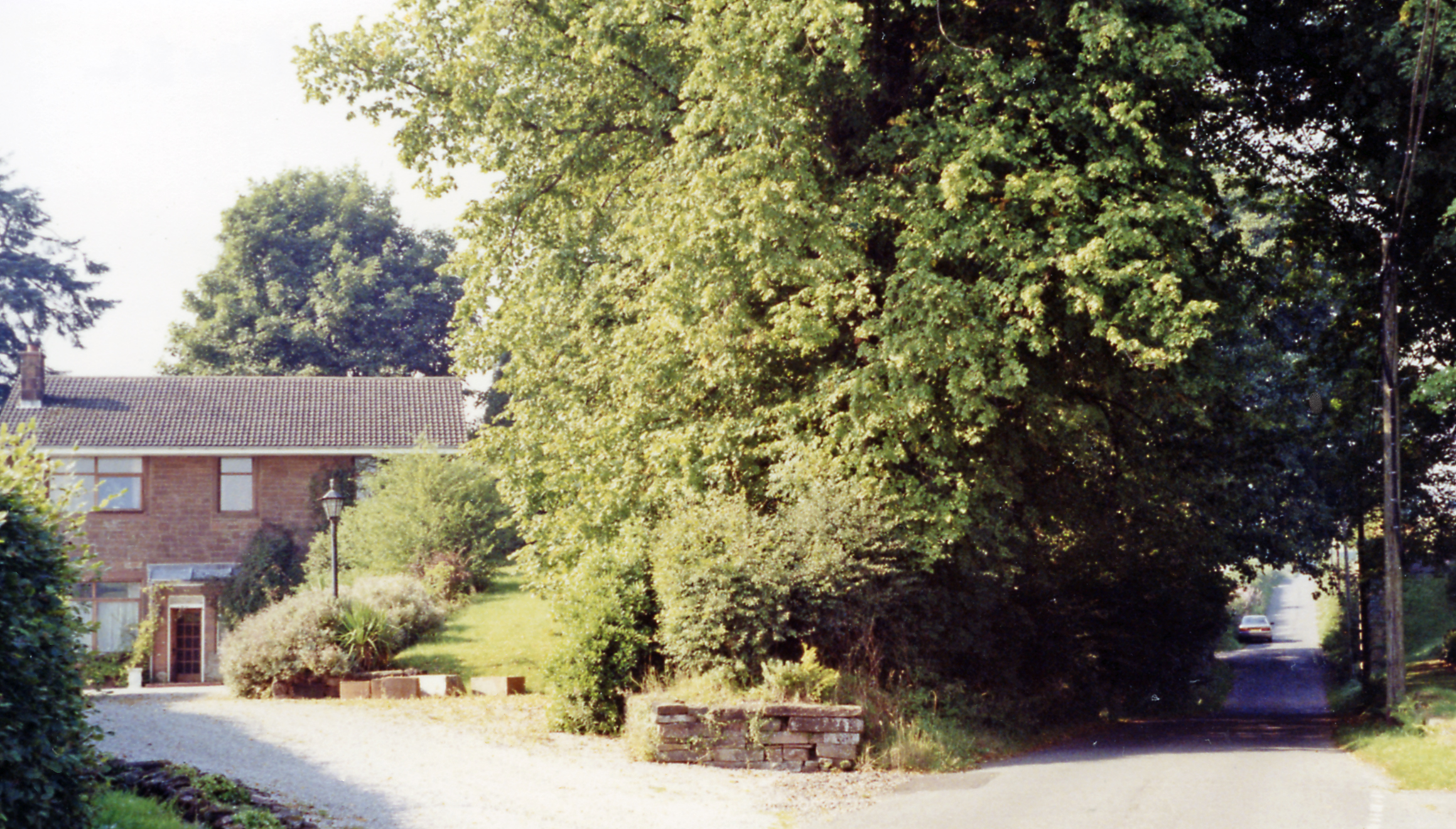
- Site of the station, 1991

General information
- Location: Amisfield, Dumfries and Galloway; Scotland
- Coordinates: 55.12933°N 3.57276°W
- Platforms: 1

Other information
- Status: Disused

History
- Original company: Dumfries, Lochmaben and Lockerbie Railway
- Pre-grouping: Caledonian Railway
- Post-grouping: London, Midland and Scottish Railway

Key dates
- 1 September 1863: Opened
- 19 May 1952: Closed
Location

Amisfield railway station was a station which served Amisfield, in the Scottish county of Dumfries and Galloway. It was served by trains on a local line which ran between the Caledonian Main Line (now known as the West Coast Main Line) at Lockerbie and the Castle Douglas and Dumfries Railway at Dumfries. The latter station is now the nearest to Amisfield.

== History ==
Opened by the Dumfries, Lochmaben and Lockerbie Railway, then part of the Caledonian Railway it became part of the London Midland and Scottish Railway during the Grouping of 1923, passing on to the Scottish Region of British Railways during the nationalisation of 1948. It was then closed by British Railways.

Preceding station	Historical railways	Following station
Locharbriggs; Line and station closed	Dumfries, Lochmaben and Lockerbie Railway; Caledonian Railway	Shieldhill; Line and station closed

== The site today ==
Some parts of the platform remain and the station house is now a private residence.
