= Locharbriggs railway station =

Former railway station in Scotland

Locharbriggs
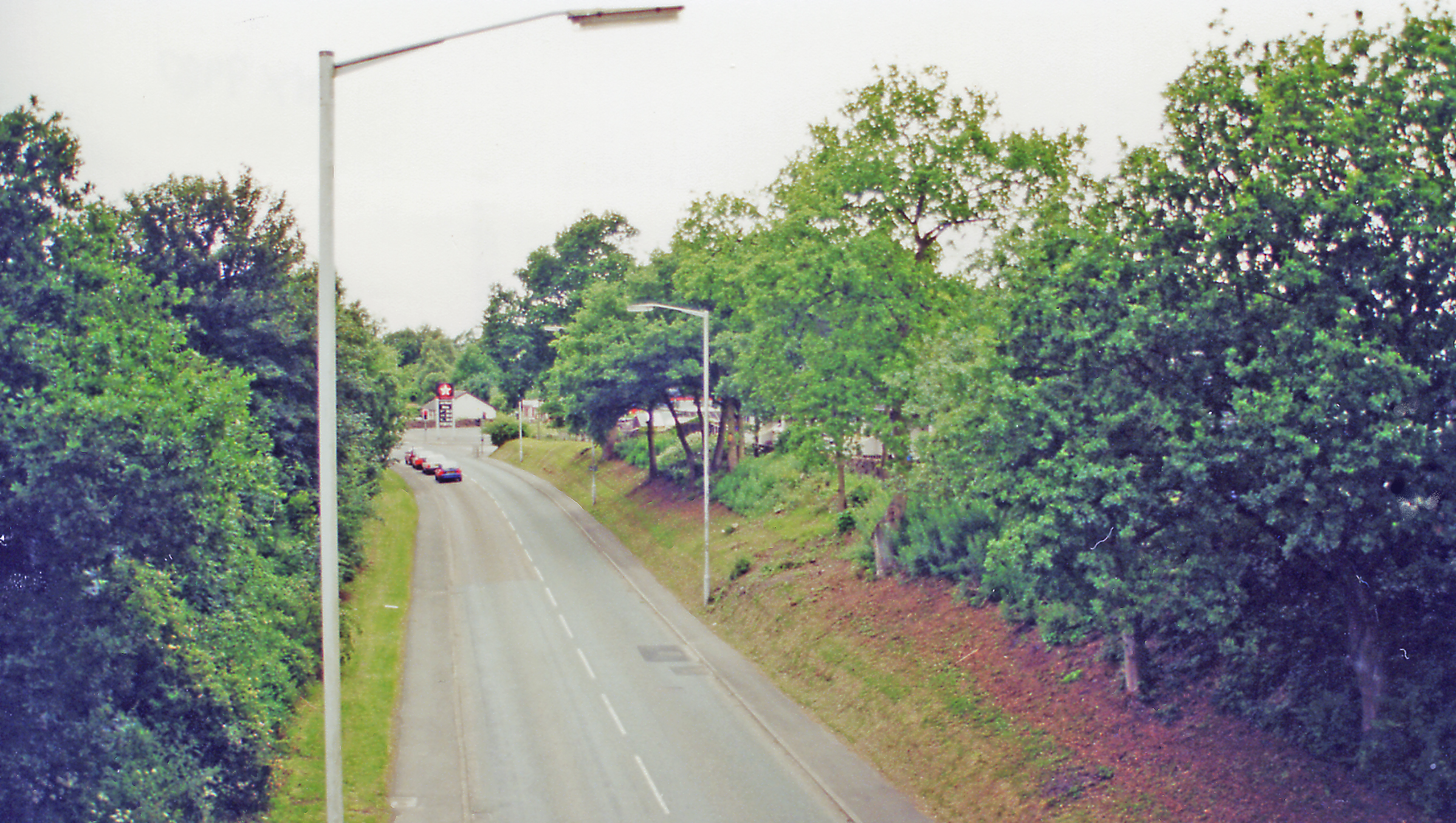
- The site of the station in 2000

General information
- Location: Locharbriggs, Dumfries and Galloway; Scotland
- Coordinates: 55.108°N 3.5785°W
- Platforms: 1

Other information
- Status: Disused

History
- Original company: Dumfries, Lochmaben and Lockerbie Railway
- Pre-grouping: Caledonian Railway
- Post-grouping: London Midland and Scottish Railway

Key dates
- 1 September 1863: Opened
- 19 May 1952: Closed
- 4 May 1964: Closed to goods
Location

Locharbriggs railway station was a station which served Locharbriggs, in the Scottish county of Dumfries and Galloway. It was served by trains on a local line which ran between the Caledonian Main Line (now known as the West Coast Main Line) at Lockerbie and the Castle Douglas and Dumfries Railway at Dumfries.

== History ==
Opened by the Dumfries, Lochmaben and Lockerbie Railway, then part of the Caledonian Railway it became part of the London Midland and Scottish Railway during the Grouping of 1923, passing on to the Scottish Region of British Railways during the nationalisation of 1948. It was then closed by British Railways.

Preceding station	Historical railways	Following station
Dumfries; Line closed; station open	Dumfries, Lochmaben and Lockerbie Railway; Caledonian Railway	Amisfield; Line and station closed
