= Lochmaben railway station =

Former railway station in Scotland

Lochmaben
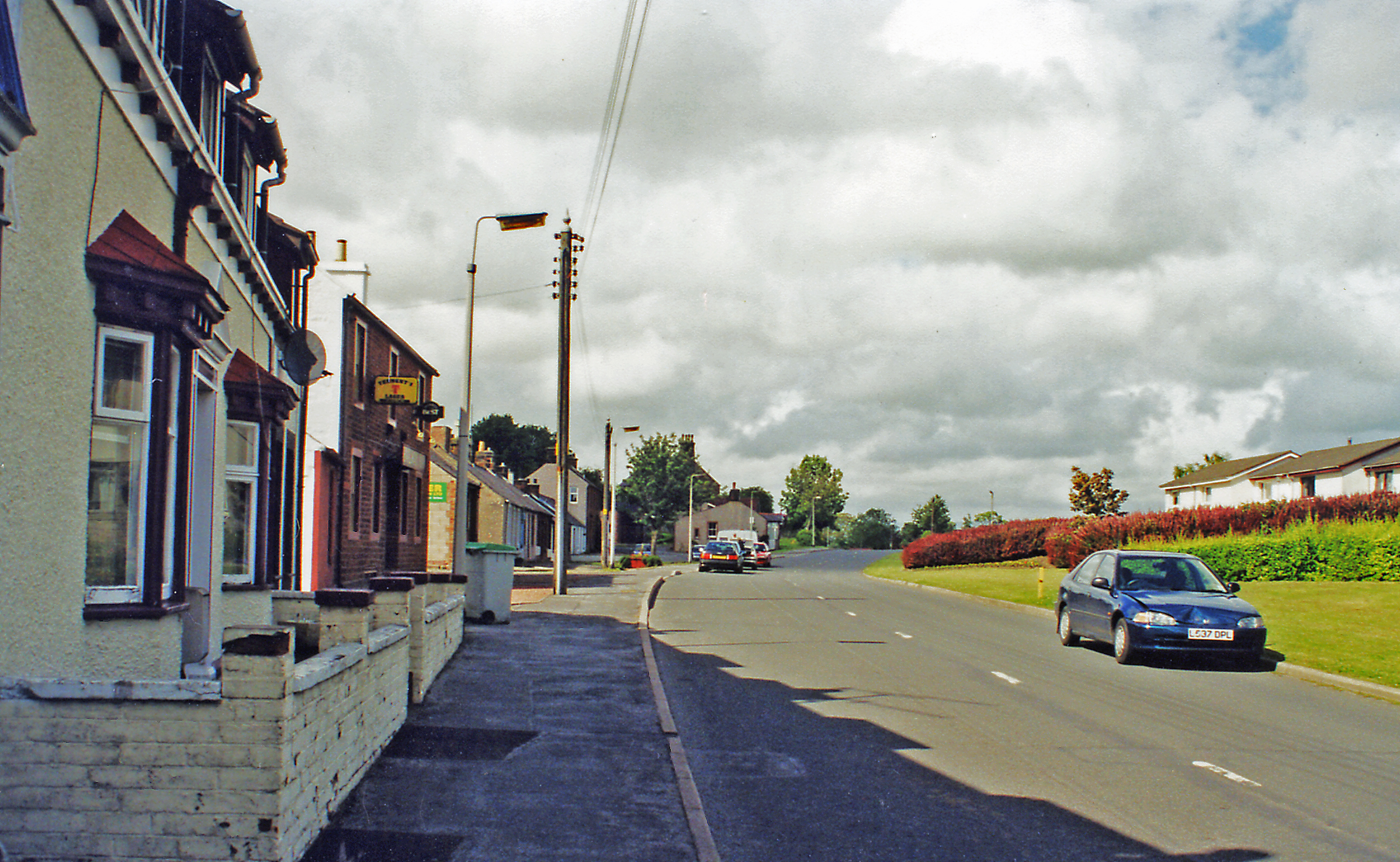
- The site of the station in 2000

General information
- Location: Lochmaben, Dumfries and Galloway; Scotland
- Coordinates: 55.1344°N 3.4405°W
- Platforms: 2

Other information
- Status: Disused

History
- Original company: Dumfries, Lochmaben and Lockerby Railway
- Pre-grouping: Caledonian Railway
- Post-grouping: London Midland and Scottish Railway

Key dates
- 1 September 1863: Opened
- 19 May 1952: Closed
Location

Lochmaben railway station was a station which served Lochmaben, in the Scottish county of Dumfries and Galloway. It was served by trains on a local line which ran between the Caledonian Main Line (now known as the West Coast Main Line) at Lockerbie and the Castle Douglas and Dumfries Railway at Dumfries.

== History ==
Opened by a small local independent company, the Dumfries, Lochmaben and Lockerby Junction Railway (DL&LJR), when it opened the line between Lockerbie and Dumfries on 1 September 1863. (Note: Lockerbie was written as Lockerby in all the companies formative documentation)

The line was operated by the Caledonian from the outset, and in 1865 the DL&LJR was amalgamated into the Caledonian Railway by Act of Parliament. It was then used by the Caledonian as a strategic link to access Nithsdale and the Portpatrick line by running powers over the Glasgow and South Western Railway (GSWR).

In its early days Lochmaben station had a single platform on the south west side of the running line with a goods yard behind the platform. There was a goods warehouse, cattle pens and a crane. By 1899 the station was situated on a passing loop and there were two platforms either side of it.

The station building was in the Scottish baronial style with crow steeped gables, along with a substantial stone goods shed.

By 1899 a road over bridge was built to replace the level crossing of the Beattock road north out of Lochmaben. Doubling of the line was proposed but never constructed.

In 1923 the line became part of the London Midland and Scottish Railway (LMS) following the Railways Grouping of 1923. Since the LMS also took over the GSWR line to Dumfries via Annan, the Dumfries to Lockerbie line lost its strategic importance, and a gradual decline set in.

Lochmaben lost its signal box in the 1930s as an economy measure and subsequently the loop line was lifted.

During the war years the station was served by elderly ex London and North western 2-4-2 tank engines working a push pull service between Lockerbie & Dumfries, then in the last few years the passenger trains were pulled by ex Caledonian locomotives, the last being ex CR"Jumbo"0-6-0 17504.

Goods facilities were retained at the station until the early 1960s, and a Scottish Region camping coach was situated at the end of the goods shed siding behind the platform from 1956 to 1961.

All goods traffic along the line ceased on 18 April 1966. Subsequently the whole site has been cleared, the B7020 road to Beattock realigned across the site of the station and housing built over most of the goods yard.

Preceding station	Historical railways	Following station
Shieldhill; Line and station closed	Dumfries, Lochmaben and Lockerbie Railway; Caledonian Railway	Lockerbie; Line closed; station open
