= Shieldhill railway station =

Former railway station in Scotland

Shieldhill

General information
- Location: Shieldhill, Dumfries and Galloway; Scotland
- Coordinates: 55.1511°N 3.5216°W
- Platforms: 1

Other information
- Status: Disused

History
- Original company: Dumfries, Lochmaben and Lockerbie Railway
- Pre-grouping: Caledonian Railway
- Post-grouping: London Midland and Scottish Railway

Key dates
- 1 September 1863: Opened
- 19 May 1952: Closed
Location

Shieldhill railway station was a station which served Shieldhill, in the Scottish county of Dumfries and Galloway. It was served by trains on a local line which ran between the Caledonian Main Line (now known as the West Coast Main Line) at Lockerbie and the Castle Douglas and Dumfries Railway at Dumfries.

== History ==
Opened by the Dumfries, Lochmaben and Lockerbie Railway, then part of the Caledonian Railway it became part of the London Midland and Scottish Railway during the Grouping of 1923, passing on to the Scottish Region of British Railways during the nationalisation of 1948. It was then closed by British Railways.

Preceding station	Historical railways	Following station
Amisfield; Line and station closed	Dumfries, Lochmaben and Lockerbie Railway; Caledonian Railway	Lochmaben; Line and station closed
