= Shieldhill =

Shieldhill may refer to the following places in Scotland:

- Shieldhill, Dumfries and Galloway
  - Shieldhill railway station, a former railway station that served Shieldhill, Dumfries and Galloway
- Shieldhill, Falkirk
- Shieldhill, South Lanarkshire, the location of Shieldhill Castle
