= Royal Highlander =

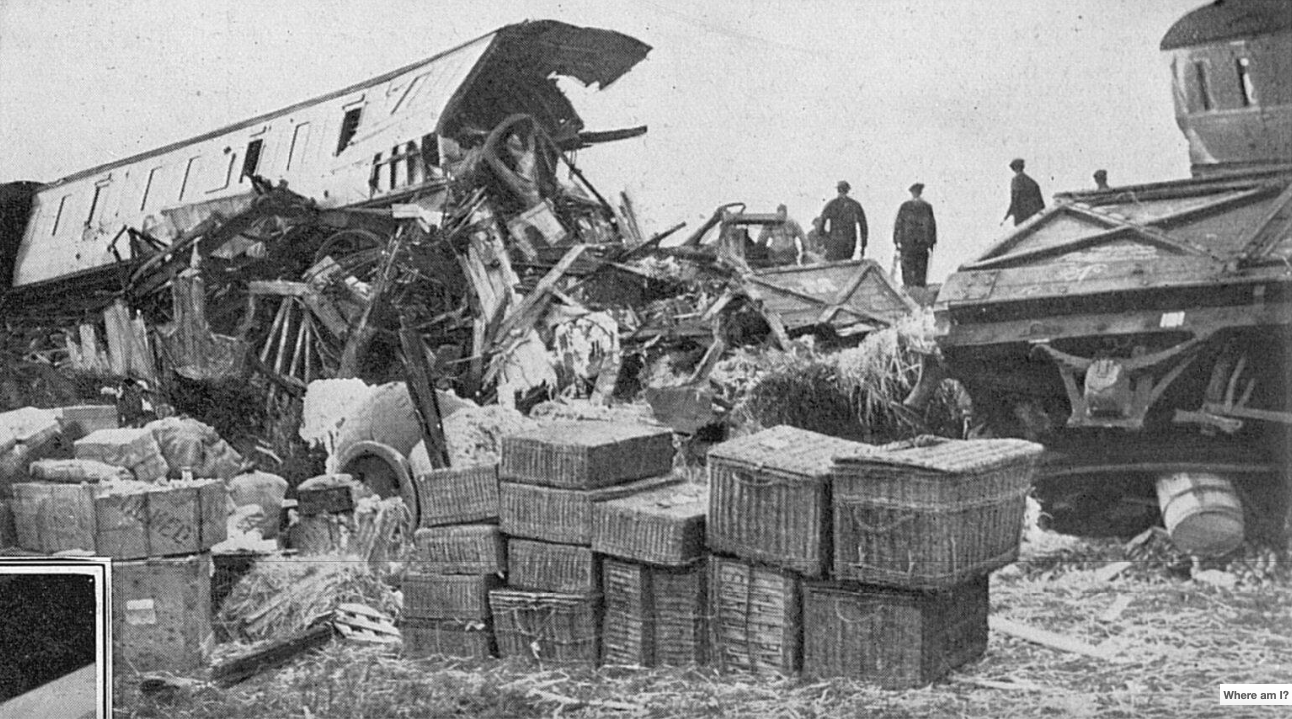
The aftermath of the collision on 28 October 1928

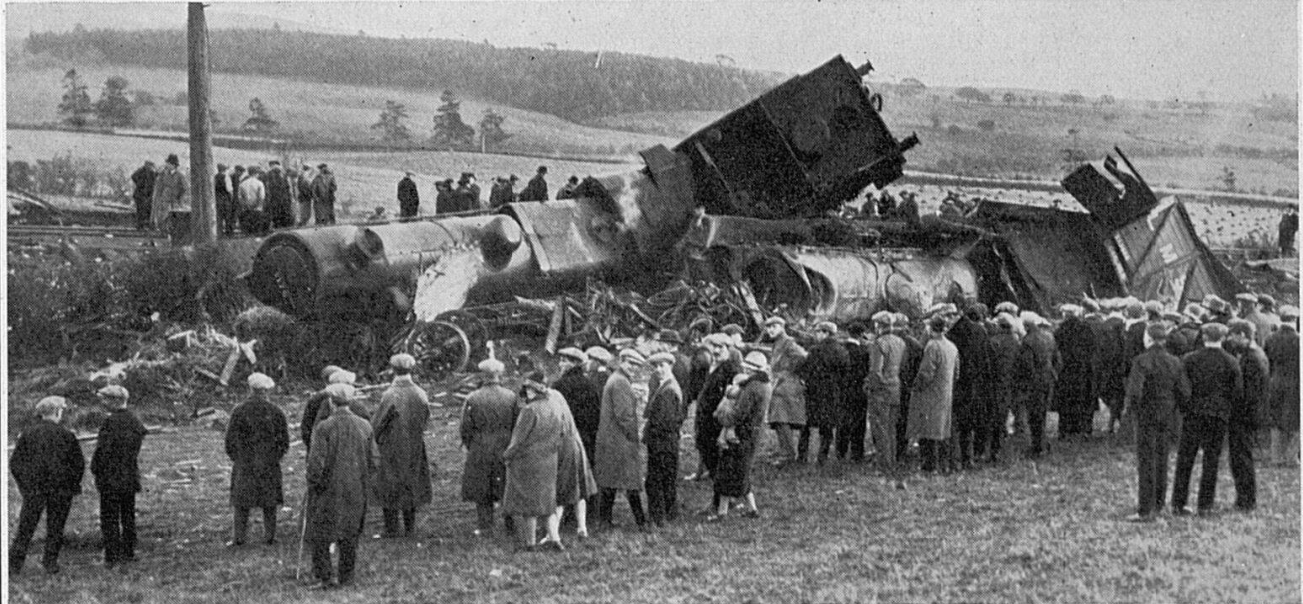
The aftermath of the collision on 28 October 1928

The Royal Highlander was a named passenger train travelling between London, England and Aberdeen, Scotland from 1927. Later it served Inverness, Scotland until it was withdrawn in May 1988.

Shortly after its introduction, on 4 October 1927 a serious derailment occurred on Logie Viaduct near Aberdeen when the second engine left the rails and the coaches behind also derailed and smashed the parapet. Fortunately, the train did not fall off the viaduct.

In its winter working it started from Euston with three pairs of sleeping cars, 1st and 3rd class, for Inverness, Aberdeen and Perth, with composite coaches and brake coaches for each destination. As far as Crewe a restaurant car was also attached.

From 1928 it departed Euston at 7.20pm and split at Crewe where the first portion went to Inverness via Carr Bridge) and Oban, and the second part went for Inverness (via Forres) and Aberdeen. The service was expanded during the "Rush to the Moors" when it left in six portions, each for a separate district, Inverness, Aberdeen and Perth, Forres line, Oban and Stranraer.

A dining car offered dinner service between London and Crewe, where it was uncoupled at approximately 10pm. A breakfast car was added at Perth at approximately 6am, offering a full cooked breakfast to accompany dawn views of the Grampians during the slow pull over Drumochter Pass behind a steam double-header.

1st, 2nd and 3rd class sleeper services were offered, as well as 1st/3rd class compartments. Trains were typically about 12 cars long, of which not more than three would have contained standard seating. The fare surcharge for a 2nd class sleeper berth was 22/6. The sleeping compartment accommodations themselves appear not to have substantially changed in design until 2012

On 28 October 1928 near Dinwoodie railway station, the Royal Highlander comprised 8-wheeled tender engine 14435 and 6 wheeled tender engine 1776 hauling ten 8-wheeled and two 12-wheeled corridor coaches. The whole train weighed around 555 tons. It was running at around 60 miles per hour (97 km/h) and collided with a freight train. The two engines of the Royal Highlander left the rails and overturned down the embankment. The leading coach mounted the debris and the following coaches were also derailed. The driver and fireman of the two engines on the express were killed instantly. The investigation by Lt. Col. A.H.L. Mount found that the signalman at Wamphray railway station, J.G. Scott, had made a mistake.

At 4.25am on 16 November 1937 in dense fog the Royal Highlander running at around 15 miles per hour (24 km/h) ran into the back of the Night Scotsman near Crewe. Both trains were hauled by LMS Royal Scot Class 4-6-0 locomotives and fifteen passengers were injured. The inquiry led by Major G.R.S. Wilson found that fault lay with the driver, W.J. Nicholson, who entered a section in advance of Coppenhall Junction without assurance that the signals were clear.

In the 1950s the Northbound train's scheduled departure from London Euston was 7:25pm, stopping at Rugby, Stafford, Crewe, Carlisle, Perth, Pitlochry, Blair Atholl, Dalwhinne, Newtonmore, Kingussie, Kincraig, Aviemore, Carrbridge, Tomatin, Moy, Daviot and Inverness, arriving approximately 9:00am next day. The Southbound train departed Inverness at approximately 5:30pm and followed the reverse route, although with fewer stops at the local stations. The train was pulled by steam engines, doubleheader, normally Duchess class locomotives assisted by an additional engine at the rear at Beattock Summit.

By 1978 the service left Euston at 9.50 p.m., arriving at Inverness at 9.00 a.m. the following morning, with Perth as the first stop. The single fare was £24.00 with an additional £4.00 for a sleeping berth. This service conveyed London based daily newspapers to the north of Scotland.

The Royal Highlander was in its day the longest-distance through train in the UK, and had the longest travel time, of almost 14 hours.
