= Auchencastle railway station =

Disused railway station in Dumfries and Galloway, Scotland

Auchencastle

General information
- Location: Dumfries and Galloway; Scotland
- Coordinates: 55.3252°N 3.4731°W
- Platforms: 2

Other information
- Status: Disused

History
- Original company: Caledonian Railway
- Pre-grouping: Caledonian Railway
- Post-grouping: London Midland and Scottish Railway

Key dates
- 3 January 1900: Station opens
- After 1926: Station close
Location

Auchencastle railway station was a private station which served Auchencastle, near Beattock, in the Scottish county of Dumfries and Galloway. It was used by railwaymen and families and was served by local trains on what is now known as the West Coast Main Line. The nearest station for Auchencastle is now at Lockerbie.

== History ==
Opened by the Caledonian Railway, it became part of the London Midland and Scottish Railway during the Grouping of 1923 and was then closed by that company.

Preceding station	Historical railways	Following station
Beattock; Line open; Station closed	Caledonian Railway; Main Line	Beattock Summit; Line open; Station closed

== The site today ==
Trains pass at speed on the electrified West Coast Main Line but there is no station at the site now.
