= Dinwoodie railway station =

Former railway station in Scotland

Dinwoodie
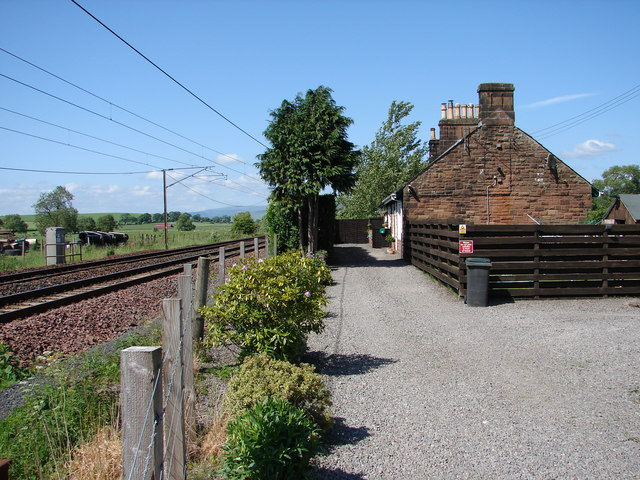
- Dinwoodie station site in 2008

General information
- Location: Dinwoodie, Dumfries and Galloway; Scotland
- Coordinates: 55.2016°N 3.4013°W
- Grid reference: NY1090990605
- Platforms: 2

Other information
- Status: Disused

History
- Original company: Caledonian Railway
- Pre-grouping: Caledonian Railway
- Post-grouping: London Midland and Scottish Railway

Key dates
- 10 September 1847: Opened
- 13 June 1960: Closed
Location

Dinwoodie railway station was a station which served the rural area around the settlement of Dinwoodie, 6 miles north of Lockerbie in Applegarth parish, Scottish county of Dumfries and Galloway. It was served by local trains on what is now known as the West Coast Main Line. The nearest station for Dinwoodie is now at Lockerbie.

== History ==
Opened by the Caledonian Railway on 10 September 1847, or 15 February 1848 is another suggested opening date for the station. It became part of the London Midland and Scottish Railway during the Grouping of 1923 and was then closed by British Railways in 1960.

=== Dinwoodie derailment ===
On 25 October 1928 an accident took place in LMS days near Dinwoodie due to signaller error and fatigue which resulted in a collision from the rear involving two trains. A derailment occurred and the train fell some height from the embankment. Four people were killed and five injured. The two drivers and two firemen died instantly when their double-headed passenger express, the Royal Highlander, collided with a broken down freight train and their memorial is in Stanwix cemetery.

Preceding station	Historical railways	Following station
Nethercleugh; Line open; Station closed	Caledonian Railway; Main Line	Wamphray; Line open; Station closed

== The site today ==
Trains pass at speed on the electrified West Coast Main Line. The stationmaster's house is now a private dwelling and the platforms have been demolished; the station cottages also survive as private dwellings. A signal box controlled the level crossing on the minor road which has now been closed and an overbridge built nearby.
