= Wamphray railway station =

Disused railway station in Newton Wamphray, Dumfries and Galloway

Wamphray
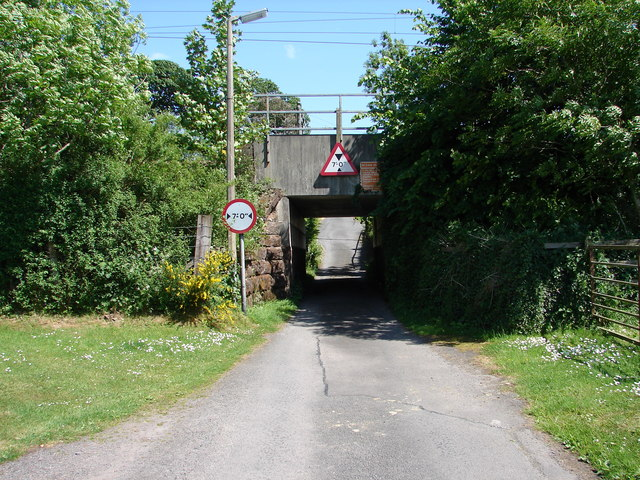
- Plantation Bridge near the old station

General information
- Location: Newton Wamphray, Dumfries and Galloway; Scotland
- Coordinates: 55.2413°N 3.3957°W
- Grid reference: NY1135395018
- Platforms: 2

Other information
- Status: Disused

History
- Original company: Caledonian Railway
- Pre-grouping: Caledonian Railway
- Post-grouping: London Midland and Scottish Railway

Key dates
- 10 September 1847: Station opened
- 13 June 1960: Station closed
Location

Wamphray railway station served Newton Wamphray, near Beattock, in the Scottish county of Dumfries and Galloway. It was served by local trains on what is now known as the West Coast Main Line. The nearest station for Newton Wamphray is now at Lockerbie. It was originally known as Wamphraygate.

== History ==
Opened by the Caledonian Railway, it became part of the London Midland and Scottish Railway during the Grouping of 1923 and was then closed by British Railways in 1960.

A description in 1848 records the following:

As a 'cutting' was required as the railroad neared Wamphray Station the earth removed was made into a series of bings - known to this day as the 'Barrow Pits'. There was a crowd at Wamphray Station on the first Lockerbie Lamb Fairday after the opening of the railway to traffic, and some of the 'rising generation' of that day climbed on to the roof of the carriages and sat there and eventually reached their destination without mishap. The first stationmaster was Mr. Bell and from an old photograph made available by a direct descendant still living in Wamphray, the station staff and surfacemen locally employed on this new railway was quite formidable. Now lime, manure and all types of goods required on the farms flowed in, and likewise the farmers could get their saleable stock and grain despatched with ease to good market centres, and at a later date when the farmers in the low lying district realised the need for milk in the cities and the worth of a dairy farm, Wamphray Station was a busy place as the milk floats rushed the milk to catch the 'mailk train' which conveyed it to Glasgow and Edinburgh and at times as far as Dundee.

The station building is now a private dwelling and the platforms have been demolished. In 1868 John Bell was the stationmaster.

Preceding station	Historical railways	Following station
Dinwoodie; Line open; Station closed	Caledonian Railway; Main Line	Beattock; Line open; Station closed

== The site today ==
Trains pass at speed on the electrified West Coast Main Line but there is no station at the site now.
