= Beattock railway station =

Disused railway station in Scotland

Beattock
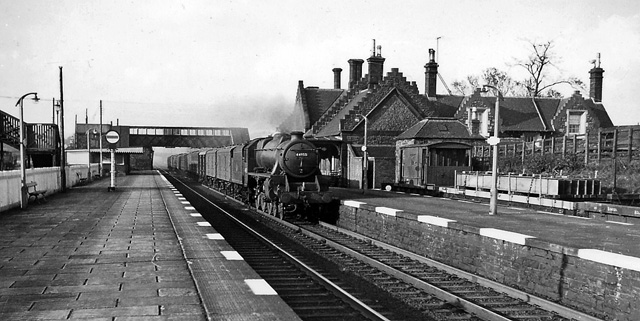
- Beattock railway station in 1961

General information
- Location: Dumfries and Galloway; Scotland
- Coordinates: 55.306888°N 3.455065°W
- Platforms: 3

Other information
- Status: Disused

History
- Original company: Caledonian Railway
- Pre-grouping: Caledonian Railway
- Post-grouping: London Midland and Scottish Railway

Key dates
- 10 September 1847: Opened
- 3 January 1972: Closed
Location

Beattock railway station was a station which served the village of Beattock, in the parish of Kirkpatrick-Juxta in the Scottish county of Dumfries and Galloway. It was served by trains on what was originally the Caledonian Main Line, and is now known as the West Coast Main Line. Between 1881 and 1964, Beattock was also the junction for the short branch line to Moffat. Following closure in 1972, the nearest station is at Lockerbie.

== History ==
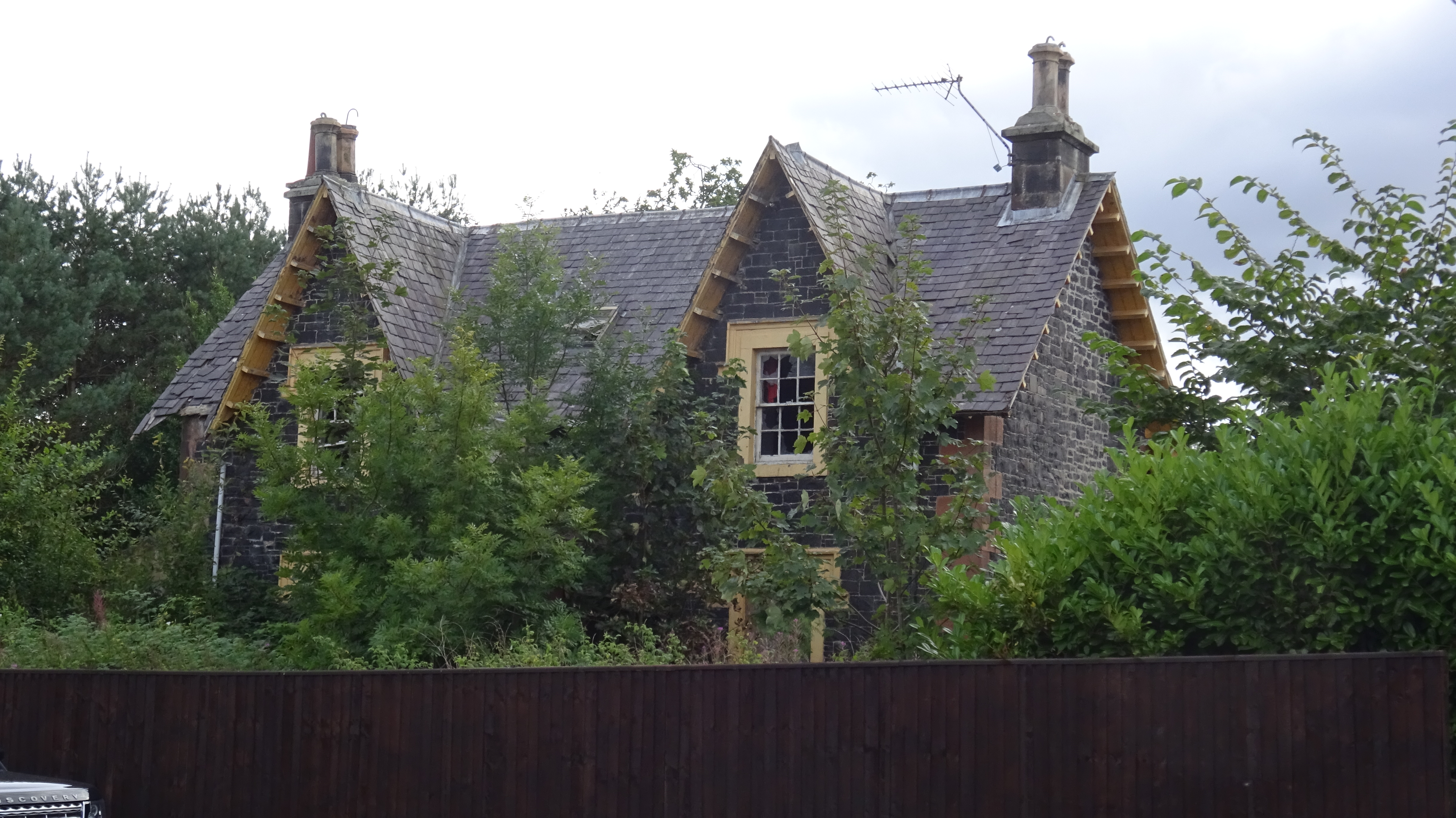
The old stationmaster's house

Opened by the Caledonian Railway, it became part of the London Midland and Scottish Railway during the Grouping of 1923. It survived the closures in the 1960s, being closed as part of the electrification of the West Coast Main Line, the reason being mentioned by O.S Nock in his book as "the very small amount of traffic currently using it would not warrant the necessary rebuilding and safety improvements to allow electric trains to call."

In steam days, Beattock was of some importance is railway terms, as it was common practice for northbound trains to stop there in order for a bank engine to be added to the train, and assist them for the 10 miles (16 km) climb to Beattock Summit. Because of the importance of Beattock Summit, the main line route between London and Glasgow became known as ‘via Beattock’ in order to differentiate it from the East Coast Main Line, As late as the mid-1960s there were over 150 staff employed by the railway at Beattock.

The station features in the novel The Thirty-Nine Steps, written by John Buchan. Richard Hannay walks to the station from Moffat, before catching a night-train south to England. There is a short story "Beattock for Moffatt" by Robert Bontine Cunninghame Graham about a Scotsman with consumption hoping to reach Beattock before he dies.

Preceding station	Historical railways	Following station
Wamphray; Line open; Station closed	Caledonian Railway; Main Line	Auchencastle; Line open; Station closed
Terminus	Caledonian Railway; Moffat Railway	Moffat; Line and Station closed

== Current operations ==
Trains pass at speed on the electrified West Coast Main Line. The remnants of the station are still visible on the site. Following the trackwork associated with the electrification work, Beattock retained the down loop, and an up loop was created.

== Reopening campaign ==
There is an active campaign to reopen Beattock station.
