= Nethercleugh railway station =

Former railway station in Scotland

Nethercleugh

General information
- Location: Nethercleugh, Dumfries and Galloway; Scotland
- Coordinates: 55.1607°N 3.3821°W
- Grid reference: NY1203586032
- Platforms: 2

Other information
- Status: Disused

History
- Original company: Caledonian Railway
- Pre-grouping: Caledonian Railway
- Post-grouping: London Midland and Scottish Railway

Key dates
- 10 September 1847: Opened
- 13 June 1960: Closed
Location

Nethercleugh railway station was a station which served the rural area around Nethercleugh and the estate of Jardine Hall, 3 miles north of Lockerbie in Applegarth parish, Scottish county of Dumfries and Galloway. It was served by local trains on what is now known as the West Coast Main Line. The nearest station for Nethercleugh is now at Lockerbie.

== History ==
Opened by the Caledonian Railway, it became part of the London Midland and Scottish Railway during the Grouping of 1923 and was then closed by British Railways in 1960.

A mineral line ran down to the station from Corncockle Quarry, a large and historically important sandstone quarry near Templand. Stone from this quarry was used in Victorian times to build tenements in Edinburgh and Glasgow. Dinosaur footprints were found there in the 19th century.

The OS maps show that a saw mill was located near the station and was served by a siding, also extensive interchange sidings for quarry traffic were present.

Preceding station	Historical railways	Following station
Lockerbie; Line and station open	Caledonian Railway; Main Line	Dinwoodie; Line open; Station closed

== The site today ==
Trains pass at speed on the electrified West Coast Main Line. The station and platforms have been demolished and the station site is now part of a large sawmill site. A signal box controlled the level crossing on the minor road which have now been closed and the signal box demolished.
