= Amisfield =

Village in Scotland

Coordinates: 55°07′46″N 3°34′01″W

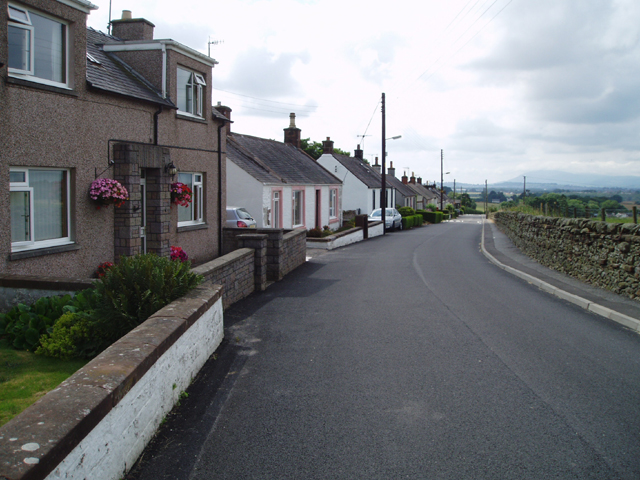

- Location within Dumfries and Galloway
- OS grid reference: NY0082
- Council area: Dumfries and Galloway
- Lieutenancy area: Dumfries
- Country: Scotland
- Sovereign state: United Kingdom
- Post town: DUMFRIES
- Postcode district: DG1
- Dialling code: 01387
- Police: Scotland
- Fire: Scottish
- Ambulance: Scottish
- UK Parliament: Dumfriesshire, Clydesdale and Tweedale
- Scottish Parliament: Dumfriesshire

Amisfield is a village in Dumfries and Galloway, Scotland. It is located about 5 miles north of Dumfries and next to the A701 Dumfries to Edinburgh road. The village used to have a railway station, however this closed in 1952.
