= Moffat railway station =

Railway station in Scotland

Moffat
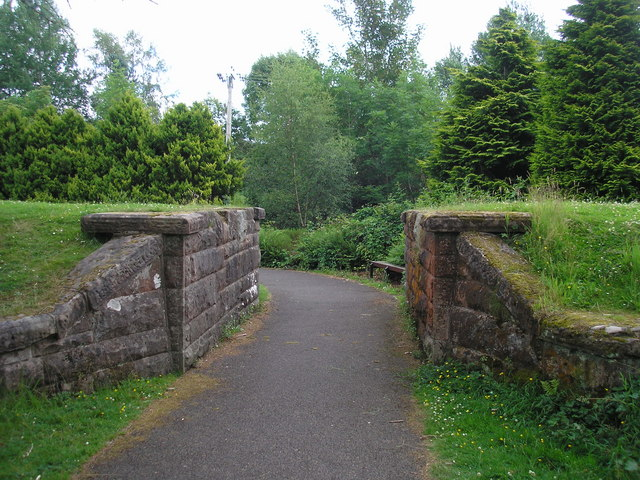
- Railway bridge abutments near Moffat

General information
- Location: Dumfries and Galloway; Scotland
- Coordinates: 55.3303°N 3.4438°W
- Grid reference: NT0849804982
- Platforms: 1

Other information
- Status: Disused

History
- Original company: Caledonian Railway
- Pre-grouping: Caledonian Railway
- Post-grouping: London Midland and Scottish Railway

Key dates
- 2 April 1883: Opened
- 6 December 1954: Closed to passengers
- 6 April 1964: Closed to goods
Location

Moffat railway station was a station and the terminus of a short branch line which served Moffat, in the Scottish county of Dumfries and Galloway. It was served by trains from the junction at the now closed Beattock.

== History ==
When the Caledonian Railway was authorised on 31 July 1845, its route was constrained by the difficult terrain of the Southern Uplands, and it followed the Evan Water through Beattock. Moffat was already an important spa town, but the topography prevented it from being directly connected. From 1878 a hydropathic establishment was founded in the town, making use of the thermal springs there.

Moffat Railway Act 1881
- Act of Parliament
- Parliament of the United Kingdom
- Long title: An Act to authorise the construction and maintenance of a railway from near the Beattock Station of the Caledonian Railway to Moffat; and for other purposes.
- Citation: 44 & 45 Vict. c. lxxxii

Dates
- Royal assent: 27 June 1881

Text of statute as originally enacted

Moffat Railway Act 1882
- Act of Parliament
- Parliament of the United Kingdom
- Long title: An Act to enable the Moffat Railway Company to construct a railway to the Beattock Station of the Caledonian Railway Company and for other purposes.
- Citation: 45 & 46 Vict. c. xlviii

Dates
- Royal assent: 19 June 1882

Text of statute as originally enacted

When the Caledonian Railway declined to build a branch line, local interests considered a railway connection to be advantageous, and promoted a branch line. The Moffat Railway was incorporated by the Moffat Railway Act 1881 (44 & 45 Vict. c. lxxxii) on 27 June 1881 with capital of £25,330. (Note: Ross says the line cost £16,000, citing the Glasgow Herald newspaper of 5 May 1881. This may have been an optimistic publicity statement.) The authorised capital needed to be extended (by the Moffat Railway Act 1882 (45 & 46 Vict. c. xlviii) of 19 June 1882) in order to allow an extension to the Caledonian Railway's Beattock station: the original intention was to join the railway some distance north of the station, but the modification resulted in the line running parallel with the Caledonian Railway main line to the Beattock station.

The line opened on 2 April 1883. It was leased to the Caledonian Railway under the Caledonian Railway (No. 1) Act 1884 (47 & 48 Vict. c. cxxix) and worked by them. The Moffat Railway was absorbed by the Caledonian by the Caledonian Railway Act 1889 (52 & 53 Vict. c. xii) of 11 May 1889, with effect from on 11 November 1889.

The line was only 1 mile and 71 chains (3 km) in length, with no intermediate stations; the passenger train journey took between four and six minutes. Kinnear, Moodie and Co. of Edinburgh were the contractors for the station buildings, goods shed, and signal boxes. The station was licensed for the sale of wines and spirits and had a John Menzies bookstall on the platform.

The spa town visitors had at first a service of twelve to fifteen three coach trains per day. In around 1926 this service was replaced by the 'Moffat Bus' or 'Puffer' steam railcar that worked the line until circa 1948. The first train of the day from Beattock was the 6.45am that also took loaded or empty wagons to Moffat as required. The fare in the 1940s was 2d. one way, 3d. return.

=== The station site ===
The last passenger train from Moffat was the 3.05pm on 4 December 1954 and the last railtour was on 29 March 1964; the line closed to goods traffic on 6 April 1964. The station and goods shed were demolished and what survives (2004) is an embankment, the abutments of a railway bridge at the southern end of the town, the aptly named 'Station Park', a short section of platform and the station toilets that stood near the platform end.

Preceding station	Historical railways	Following station
Beattock; Line and Station closed	Caledonian Railway; Moffat Railway	Terminus
