= Shieldhill Castle =

Historic building in South Lanarkshire, Scotland

Coordinates: 55.6466°N 3.5822°W

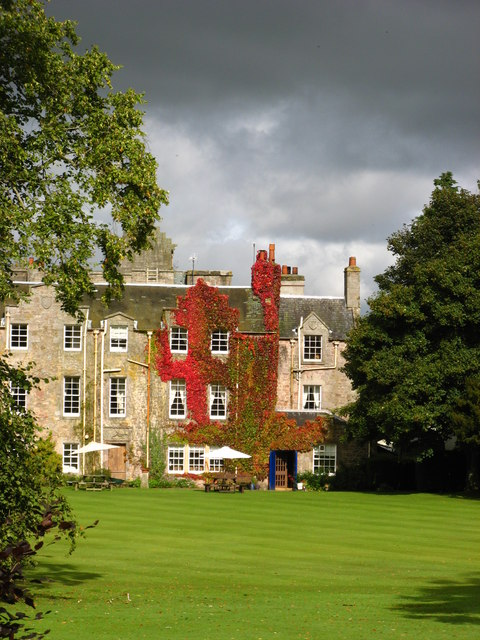

Shieldhill Castle is a category B listed building located near Biggar in South Lanarkshire. The building dates back to 1199 and is currently being run as Shieldhill Castle Hotel.

== Ownership ==
The Chancellor family resided in the castle for over 750 years. After being sold by the family it was turned into a hotel in 1959.
