= Beattock =

Village in Dumfries and Galloway, Scotland

Coordinates: 55.308°N 3.458°W

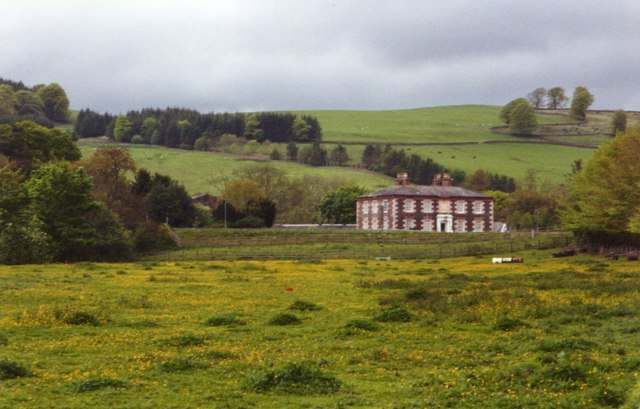
- The Old Brig Inn, a coaching inn on the old A74 road at Beattock.

- Location within Dumfries and Galloway
- Council area: Dumfries and Galloway
- Lieutenancy area: Dumfries
- Country: Scotland
- Sovereign state: United Kingdom
- Post town: MOFFAT
- Postcode district: DG10
- Dialling code: 01683
- Police: Scotland
- Fire: Scottish
- Ambulance: Scottish
- UK Parliament: Dumfriesshire, Clydesdale and Tweeddale
- Scottish Parliament: Dumfriesshire

Beattock is a village in Dumfries and Galloway, Scotland, approximately 1/2 mile (800 metres) southwest of Moffat and 19 miles (31 kilometres) north of Dumfries.

Beattock was historically served by the A74 road and the West Coast Main Line, however the road has since been upgraded to the A74(M) motorway and no longer passes through the village. Beattock railway station was closed in 1972.

Beattock Summit is located approximately 10 miles (16 km) to the north of the village in the neighbouring administrative area of South Lanarkshire. At 1,033 ft (315 m) it is the highest point on both the M74, and on the West Coast Main Line within Scotland. The poet W. H. Auden's 1936 work Night Mail makes reference to the summit.

The Southern Upland Way and the Annandale Way run close to the village.

== Governance ==
Beattock is in the parliamentary constituency of Dumfriesshire, Clydesdale and Tweeddale, David Mundell is the current Conservative Party member of parliament.

Ecclefechan is part of the South Scotland region in the Scottish Parliament, being in the constituency of Dumfriesshire. Oliver Mundell of the Conservatives is the MSP.

Before Brexit, for the European Parliament its residents voted to elect MEP's for the Scotland constituency.
