= Beattock Summit =

High point of a main railway line in Scotland

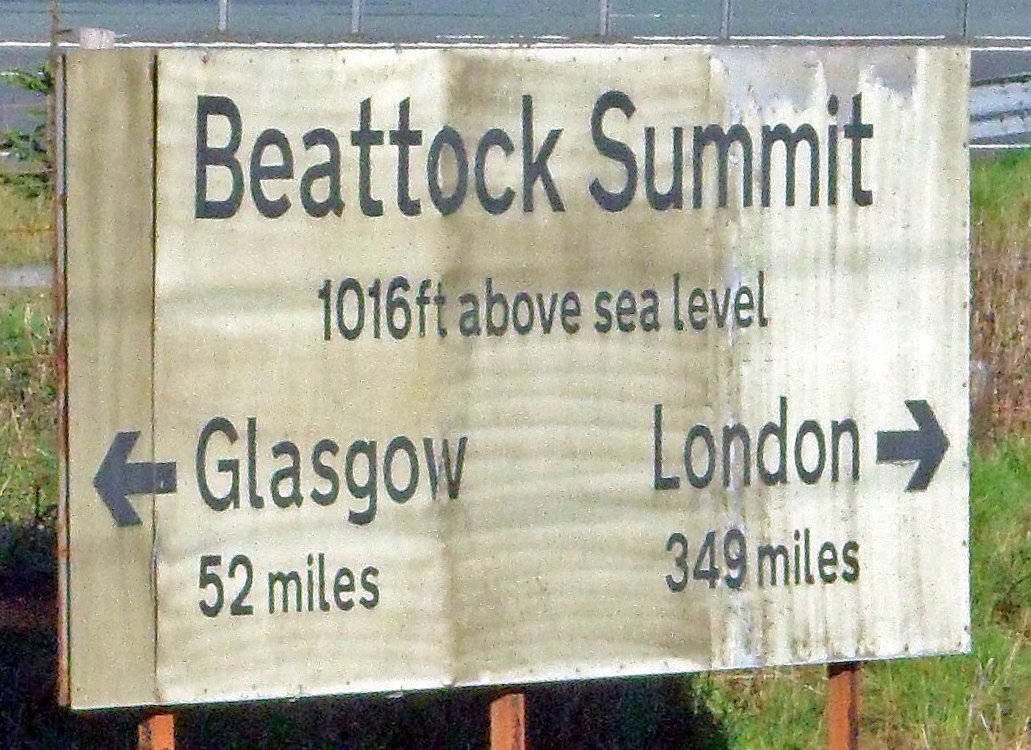
- Sign marking the summit, as seen from the West Coast Main Line

General information
- Location: South Lanarkshire; Scotland
- Coordinates: 55.4217°N 3.5907°W
- Grid reference: NS994152
- Platforms: 2

Other information
- Status: Disused

History
- Original company: Caledonian Railway
- Pre-grouping: Caledonian Railway
- Post-grouping: London, Midland and Scottish Railway

Key dates
- 3 January 1900: Station opened
- After 1926: Station closed
Location

Beattock Summit is the highest point of the West Coast Main Line (WCML) railway and of the A74(M) motorway as they cross between Dumfries and Galloway and South Lanarkshire in south west Scotland.

The height of the summit reached by the A74(M) motorway is 1,033 feet (315 m) above sea level. The adjacent railway reaches a slightly lower elevation of 1,016 feet (310 m). The summit is the watershed between the River Clyde to the north and Evan Water, a tributary of the River Annan to the south.

== Railway history ==
The summit is the highest point on the Caledonian Railway Main Line north of the border (built by the Caledonian Railway and opened on 15 February 1848), it is located 52 miles (83 km) south of Glasgow Central and 349 miles (558 km) north of London Euston stations. It is 62 miles (100 km) north of the second highest point on the WCML - Shap Summit in Cumbria.

The northbound climb has a 15 miles (24 km) ascent, with gradients of up to 1 in 69 (1 foot of rising or falling gradient for every 69 feet of distance) which made it a notoriously severe climb in the days of steam locomotives, which frequently required banking assistance to get their trains up the incline. There was an engine shed at Beattock which had banking locomotives on standby twenty-four hours per day to minimise train delays. The railway was electrified in 1974 by British Rail. The signal box at the summit was also removed as part of the electrification project, with the signalling now being controlled from a new power signal box at Motherwell.

The severity of the climb to the summit is referenced in W. H. Auden's poem Night Mail, written in 1936 for the G.P.O. Film Unit's celebrated production of the same name.

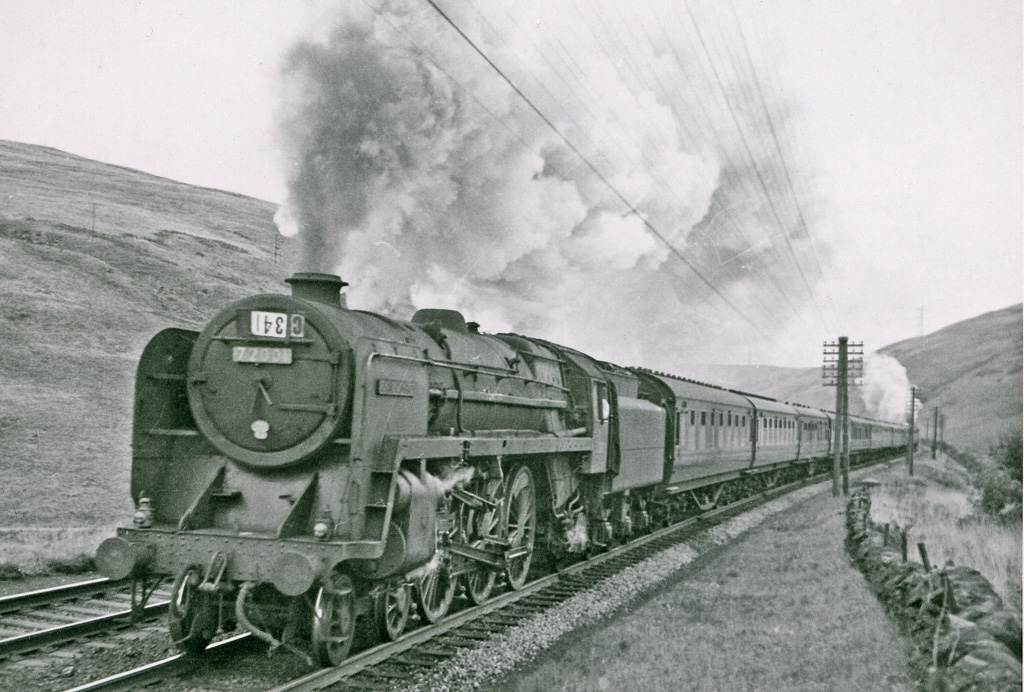
Liverpool and Manchester to Glasgow express nearing Beattock Summit in 1957

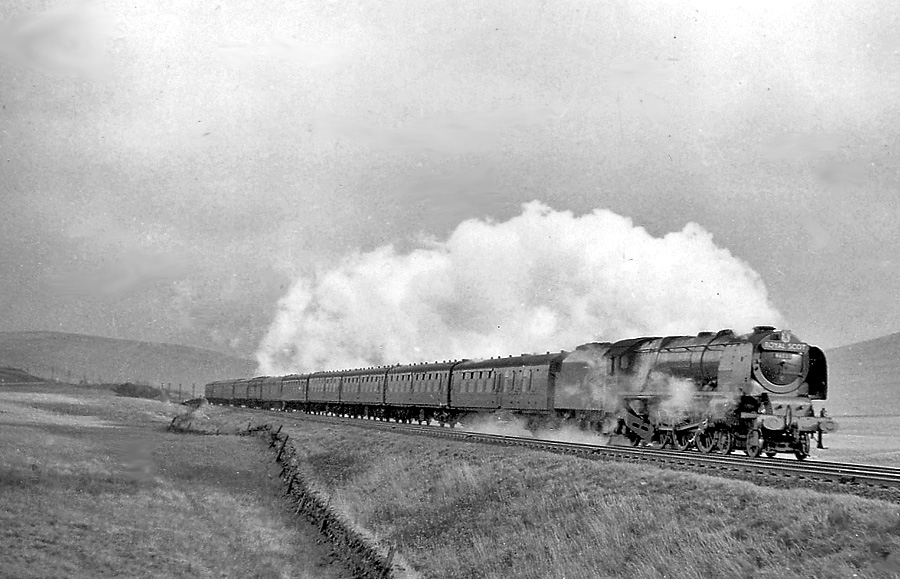
The Royal Scot approaches Beattock Summit in 1957

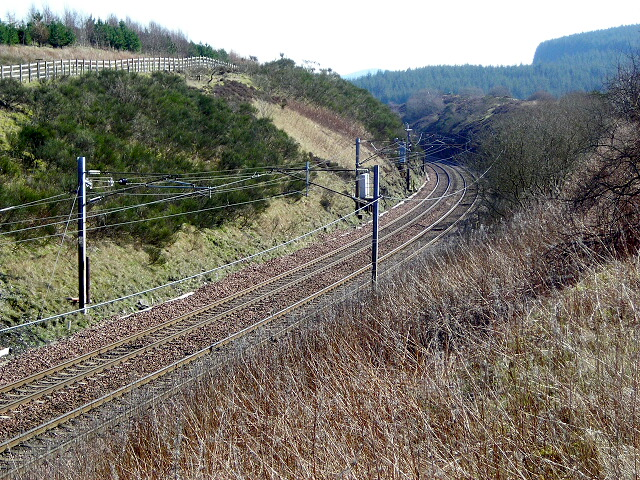
Railway cutting near Beattock Summit

=== Private station ===
The summit was the location of a private halt from 1900 to around 1926. 1966

Preceding station	Historical railways	Following station
Auchencastle; Line open; Station closed	Caledonian Railway; Main Line	Elvanfoot; Line open; Station closed

== See also ==
- Shap Summit
