= Dumfries railway station =

Railway station in Dumfries and Galloway, Scotland

Dumfries Scottish Gaelic: Dùn Phris
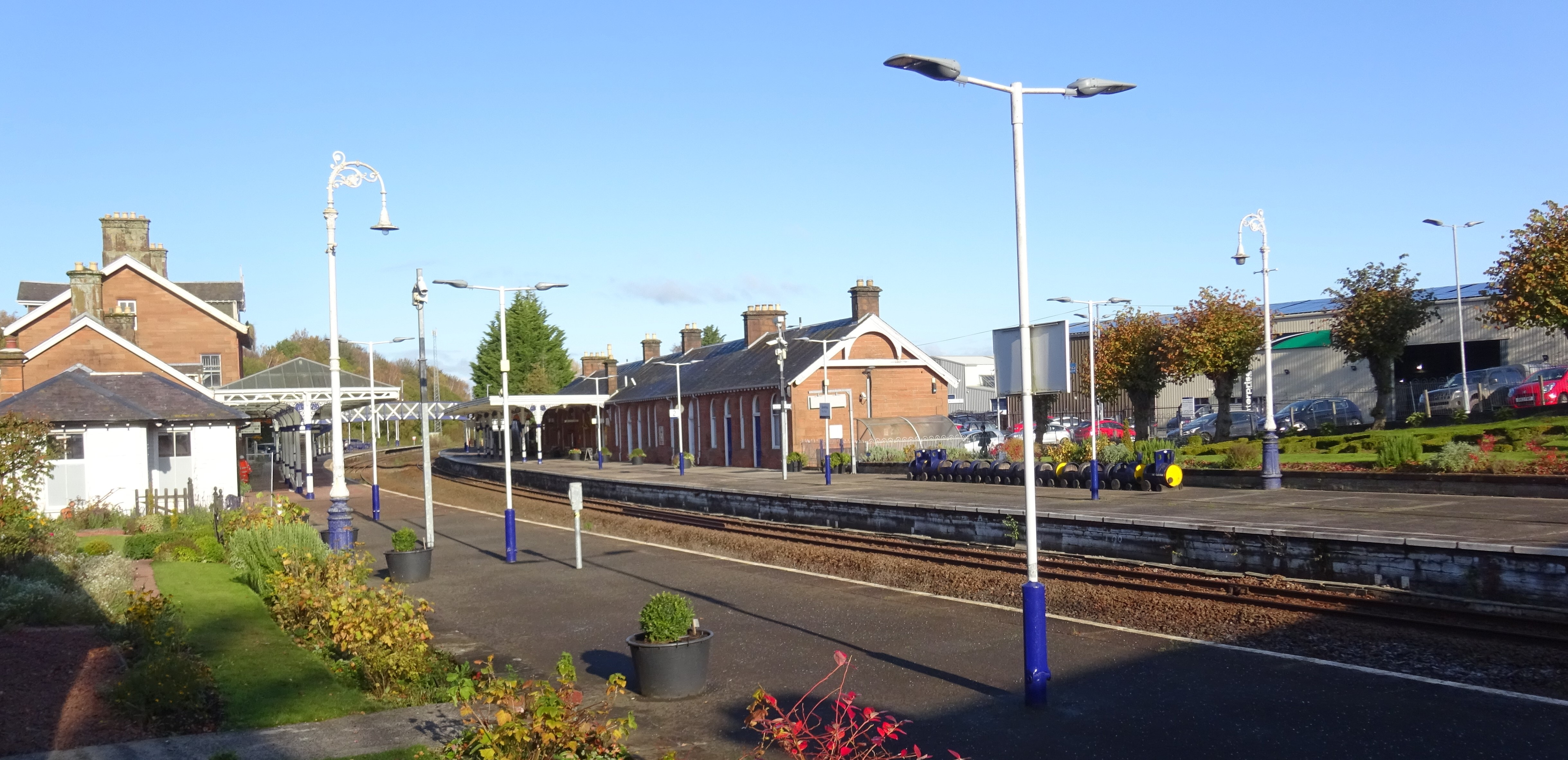

General information
- Location: Dumfries, Dumfries and Galloway; Scotland
- Coordinates: 55.0728°N 3.6045°W
- Grid reference: NX976765
- Managed by: ScotRail
- Platforms: 2

Other information
- Station code: DMF

Key dates
- 1848: Opened
- 1850: Line to Glasgow opened

Passengers
- 2020/21: ▼44,712
- 2021/22: ▲0.232 million
- 2022/23: ▲0.291 million
- 2023/24: ▲0.360 million
- 2024/25: ▼0.346 million

Listed Building – Category B
- Designated: 6 March 1981
- Reference no.: LB26343
Location
Notes
- Passenger statistics from the Office of Rail and Road

Dumfries railway station serves the town of Dumfries in Dumfries and Galloway, Scotland. It is located on the Glasgow South Western Line. The station is owned by Network Rail and managed by ScotRail who provide all passenger train services. It is staffed on a part-time basis throughout the week.

== History ==
Opened by the Glasgow, Dumfries and Carlisle Railway in 1848, the line serving it was extended northwards to Kilmarnock and Glasgow two years later (the GD&CR became part of the Glasgow and South Western Railway at the same time). It subsequently became the junction for branches to Castle Douglas and Stranraer (opened between 1859 and 1861), Lockerbie (opened in 1863 and taken over in 1865 by the Caledonian Railway) and latterly to Moniaive (Cairn Valley Railway, opened in 1905). All of these later lines have now closed (the Port Road to Stranraer being the last to go in June 1965), leaving only the original G&SWR main line open to serve the town. The Beeching Axe cutting the Castle Douglas and Dumfries Railway and Portpatrick and Wigtownshire Railway has resulted in adverse mileage to connect Stranraer with a longer line via Kilmarnock and Ayr. The journey by railway and ferry via Stranraer to Larne Harbour or since the line closed to the Port of Belfast is much longer.

Historic Scotland have designated the station and separately the adjacent station hotel as category B listed buildings.

Carnation built an evaporated milk factory in Dumfries that opened in 1935, eventually constructing three units producing tin cans, evaporated milk and latterly Coffeemate. The original factory had private siding access to the station's goods yard, which gave access for milk trains to the facility, in both delivering raw product as well as distribution to London. Milk trains stopped in the mid-1970s. The United States parent company was bought by Nestle in 1985, after which a decline in the facility began. CoffeeMate production ceased in 2000, after which the site was fully redeveloped as an industrial estate.

== Future ==
In 2023 it was confirmed that step-free access to both platforms would be added. This was completed in 2024

== In fiction ==
The station features in the novel The Thirty-Nine Steps (1915) by John Buchan. Richard Hannay, fleeing from German secret agents, travels from London St Pancras to Galloway, changing trains at Dumfries. In 1939, T.S. Eliot included Dumfries in his Old Possum's Book of Practical Cats. Skimbleshanks, the Railway Cat, speaks with the police at Dumfries Station during the night.

== Services ==
=== ScotRail ===
The service from the station is somewhat infrequent with trains running to different patterns during the day, these are as follows:

On Monday to Saturdays, there is a regular hourly service southbound to/from Carlisle with extra trains running at peak times. There are 9 trains per day northbound to Kilmarnock and Glasgow which run every 2 hours. On Sundays, there is a 2 hourly service southbound to Carlisle (5 in total) but a very limited service of 2 trains per day northbound to Kilmarnock and Glasgow. There was a direct service to Stranraer via Kilmarnock but this ceased in 2009. Services running through Carlisle to Newcastle were stopped at the May 2022 timetable change.

Preceding station	National Rail	Following station
Annan	ScotRail; Glasgow South Western Line	Sanquhar
	Historical railways	
Maxwelltown; Line and station closed	Glasgow and South Western Railway; Castle Douglas and Dumfries Railway	Terminus
Locharbriggs; Line and station closed	Caledonian Railway; Dumfries, Lochmaben and Lockerbie Railway	Terminus

== Gallery ==
=== 1960 ===
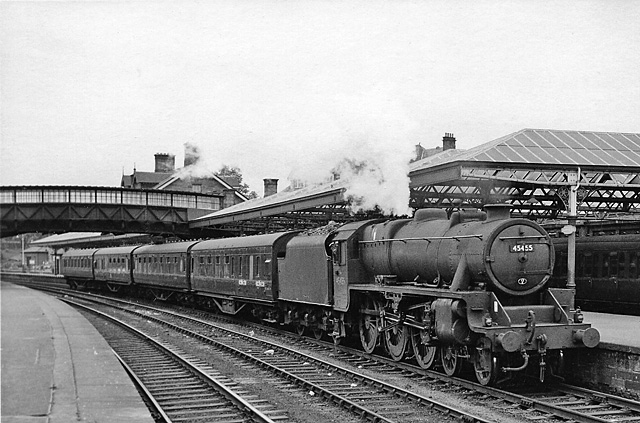
The station in 1960

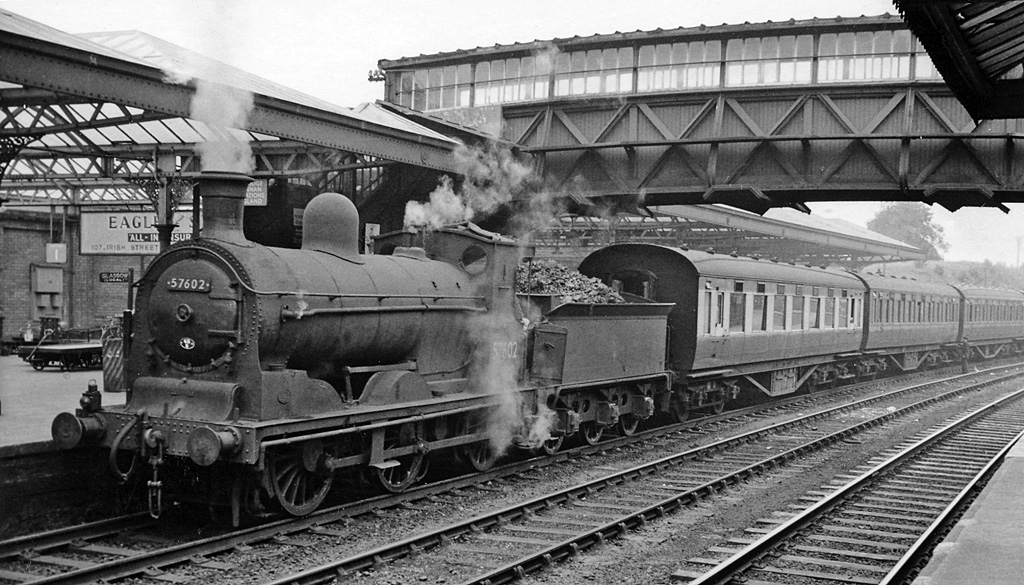
The station pilot at the rear of a Down express in 1960

=== 2009 ===
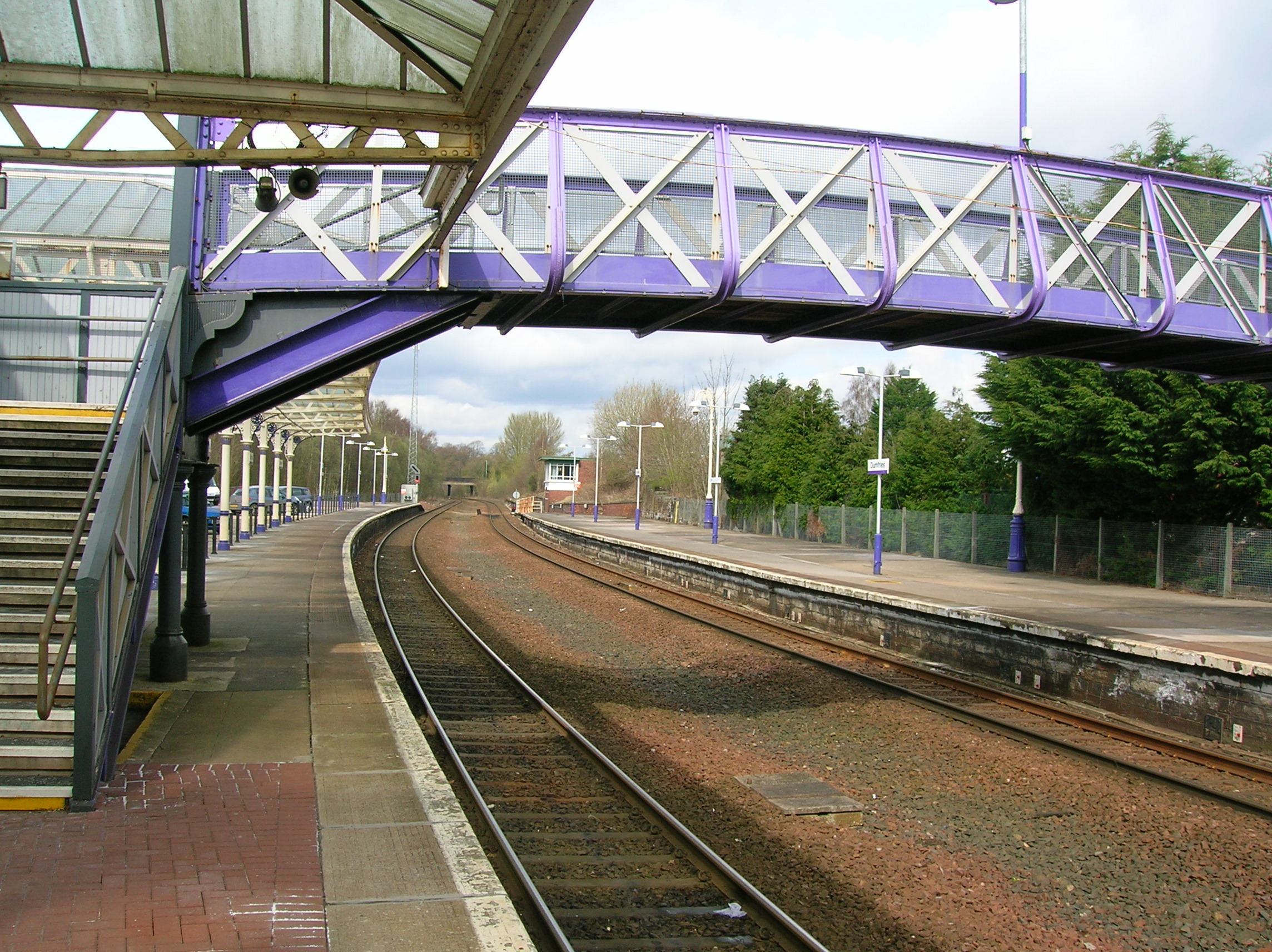
Looking north with the site of the old Port Road line bay platforms to the left

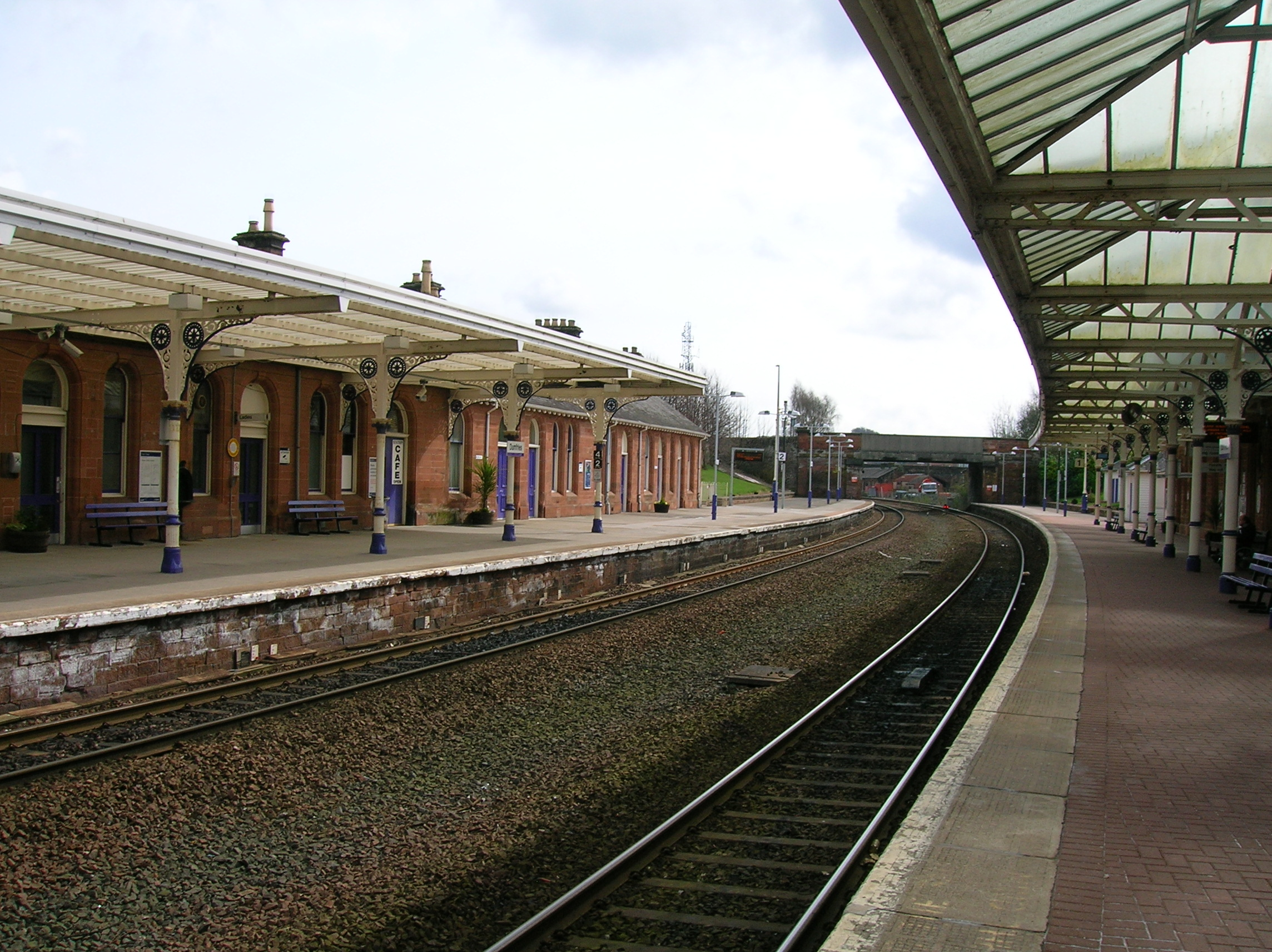
Looking south towards Annan with the site of the old goods station beyond the road bridge
