= Caledonian Main Line =

Former railway line in Scotland

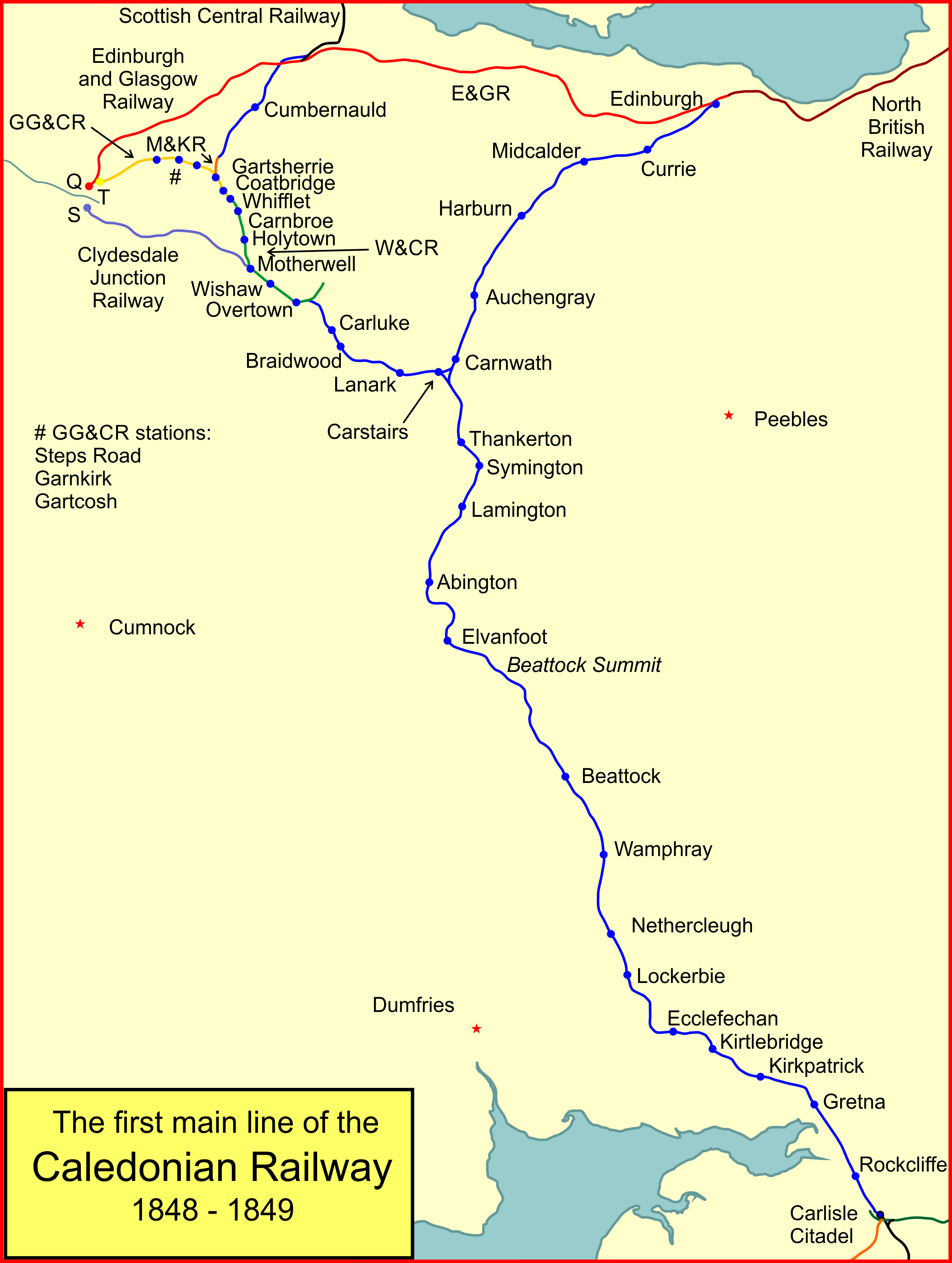
The Caledonian main line, 1848–1849

The Caledonian Main Line is a railway connecting the Scottish cities of Glasgow and Edinburgh with Carlisle, via Carstairs and Beattock. It was opened in 1847 by the Caledonian Railway. The approach to Glasgow used railways already built, primarily for mineral traffic; these were later by-passed by a more direct route. Today, the route forms the northern section of the West Coast Main Line, and was electrified in the early 1970s.

== Background ==
From 1830 onwards considerable attention was given to the means by which Glasgow and Edinburgh might be connected to London, and as English railways began to develop into a network, the urgency of making a railway accelerated. The difficult terrain of the Southern Uplands and Cumberland made the selection of a route controversial. After much difficulty, the Caledonian Railway was authorised to build a line via Beattock; this was known as the Annandale Route.

On 10 September 1847 the line was opened between Carlisle and Beattock. The station at Carlisle was built and operated jointly with the London and North Western Railway. (Later other companies shared in the operation there.) Construction continued and on 15 February 1848 the line was opened between Beattock and Glasgow, completing the Carlisle to Glasgow route. Finally the line from Carstairs to Edinburgh opened on 1 April 1848.

=== Competition for traffic to England ===
The main line as planned was hoped to be the sole connection between Scottish cities and the English network. In fact this proved ill-founded, as the North British Railway (NBR) opened its line to Berwick-upon-Tweed, forming part of a line to London that became known as the East Coast Main Line in alliance with English lines. At first this route involved two changes of trains until bridges over the River Tweed at Berwick and the River Tyne at Newcastle were completed. This route was competitive for transits from Edinburgh to London, but Glasgow was less conveniently served.

On the west side of the country the Glasgow and South Western Railway (G&SWR) had a route between Glasgow and Carlisle; however it was hampered by reliance on the Caledonian Railway route for the final approach to Carlisle, and primacy of the Caledonian Railway and its English ally, the London and North Western Railway (LNWR), there. The G&SWR route was uncompetitive for traffic to and from Edinburgh.

A third route was another North British Railway route that became known as the Waverley Route between Edinburgh and Carlisle. This route too suffered from the dominance of the Caledonian and LNWR at Carlisle. When the Midland Railway opened its line from London to Carlisle via Leeds, the G&SWR and the NBR Waverley route had access southwards over a friendly railway at last.

== First configuration ==
=== Carlisle to Carstairs ===
At first the southern termination of the line was at Carlisle station, later named Carlisle Citadel; passengers and goods were handled there. The line ran broadly north across gently undulating country at first, crossing the River Esk and entering Scotland near Gretna, then climbing following the Kirtle Water to Lockerbie. Climbing further, the line followed the Annan Water to Beattock, and on to Beattock Summit - the highest point on the line. Crossing the watershed, the line now descended in the upper Clyde Valley; the course of the Clyde here is much more hilly and the line follows a series of broad reverse curves as it continues through Abington and Thankerton, emerging on to slightly flatter terrain at Carstairs.

=== Carstairs to Glasgow ===
Now turning north-west, the Glasgow line continues past Lanark and near Carluke, joining the Wishaw and Coltness Railway (W&CR) at Garriongill Junction. The W&CR had been built as a "coal railway", primarily intended for the haulage of coal and iron ore. It had been upgraded and modernised, and leased by the Caledonian Railway. The main line used the W&CR line to Motherwell, from which point the original route is not part of the modern main line. It turned north through to Whifflat (now spelt Whifflet), joining the Glasgow, Garnkirk and Coatbridge Railway (GG&CR). This too had been built as a coal railway, and had been upgraded and renamed the Garnkirk and Glasgow Railway; it too was leased by the Caledonian Railway. From Whifflat the line ran to Coatbridge, and then turned west on through Garnkirk, terminating at the GG&CR Glasgow terminus at Townhead.

The approach to Glasgow made a long northward sweep, and the Townhead terminus was not well located for central Glasgow. During the process of obtaining parliamentary authorisation for its line, the Caledonian discovered that an independent Clydesdale Junction Railway was also being authorised. The Caledonian quickly took control of the Clydesdale Junction by leasing it during construction; it opened throughout on 1 June 1849. Its route left the Wishaw and Coltness line at Motherwell, and ran via Uddingston and Rutherglen to a terminus called Southside in Glasgow, at the junction of Cathcart Road and Pollokshaws Road. This too was inconveniently located for the city centre, but the Caledonian now had two routes to two terminal stations in Glasgow. The Clydesdale Junction route now forms the northern end of the modern Caledonian main line, extended from South Side to cross the River Clyde to Glasgow Central Station.

=== Carstairs to Edinburgh ===
The Edinburgh section of the Caledonian Main Line left Carstairs station and ran north-east. For several years passenger trains from Carlisle divided at Carstairs; the Glasgow portion proceeded, and the Edinburgh portion reversed direction towards the capital. It is likely that goods trains too ran to Carstairs and remarshalled there. A cut-off line was constructed enabling direct running from Carlisle towards Edinburgh, but it was little used and it was soon closed. Later a shorter chord line was built having the same effect.

The line continued past Cobbinshaw and Kirknewton, descending into Edinburgh in the valley of the Water of Leith. The terminus was at Lothian Road; this was later altered to Princes Street by a short extension and enlargement.

== History ==
=== 1848–1879: Early years ===
In its early years the Caledonian Railway sought to become dominant in large areas of Scotland by leasing nascent companies. It was able to do so by guaranteeing lease payments in perpetuity, which avoided any need for cash at the time, but heavily indebted the company later. It saw the best opportunities to the north of the central belt, and in Ayrshire. As the company matured, it encouraged local promoters to start construction of branch lines, taking them over by purchase if they were successful.

The principal effect of this on the main line was the construction of a branch line from Gartsherrie to Greenhill Junction, there meeting the Scottish Central Railway, and giving access to Stirling and Perth. A first, short section of this branch used the route of the earlier Monkland and Kirkintilloch Railway (M&KR), another modernised coal railway. The M&KR was not brought into the Caledonian family, and through trains from the Caledonian at Motherwell towards Stirling used a rival company's track until nationalisation of the railways in 1948.

A development that had not been foreseen was the emergence of the Monklands iron industry, which generated a huge demand for good quality iron ore and coal, and the Caledonian was fortunate that considerable reserves lay in areas served by it, or otherwise accessible over it.

These factors led to a limited number of intermediate stations on the main line, and a concentration of effort elsewhere. There were no new branches off the main line at first, but the "Lanark" station was a considerable distance from the important Burgh, and local interests promoted a branch line to Lanark, which opened in 1855.

The Symington, Biggar and Broughton Railway promoted a branch to Biggar; it was opened in 1860 after the local company had been acquired by the Caledonian, and the line was extended to Peebles in 1864.

In 1863 an independent branch line was opened to Dumfries, the Dumfries, Lochmaben and Lockerbie Railway was opened. The Caledonian acquired the line in 1865. The Portpatrick Railway had opened in 1861-1862 and the Caledonian worked it. This gave it access from Lockerbie to Stranraer and Portpatrick, enabling it to develop ferry services to the north of Ireland. It routed traffic from there to Glasgow and Edinburgh via Lockerbie, bringing considerable additional traffic to the main line. When the Portpatrick Railway was reconstituted into the Portpatrick and Wigtownshire Joint Railway, the Caledonian was a one-quarter owner.

The Dolphinton Branch was opened in 1867 from Carstairs; Dolphinton was a small settlement and the construction of the line was purely tactical.

Mineral extraction in Cumberland around Workington developed considerably, and much of the output went to the Lanarkshire iron works over the Caledonian Main Line. In 1869 an independent Solway Junction Railway was opened, with a long viaduct over the Solway Firth, and shortening the journey from Workington to the Monklands.

From the outset, the rival Glasgow and South Western Railway (G&SW) had intended to build an independent line to Carlisle from Gretna, but this was forbidden by Parliament during the authorisation process. The G&SWR was required to make a junction with the Caledonian Main Line at Gretna Junction, and to run over the line into Carlisle. That arrangement started in 1850, and the former G&SWR still operates, making the connection at Gretna Junction as before. All the other branches referred to in this section have closed, with the exception of the Lanark branch.

=== 1879–1923: Expansion ===
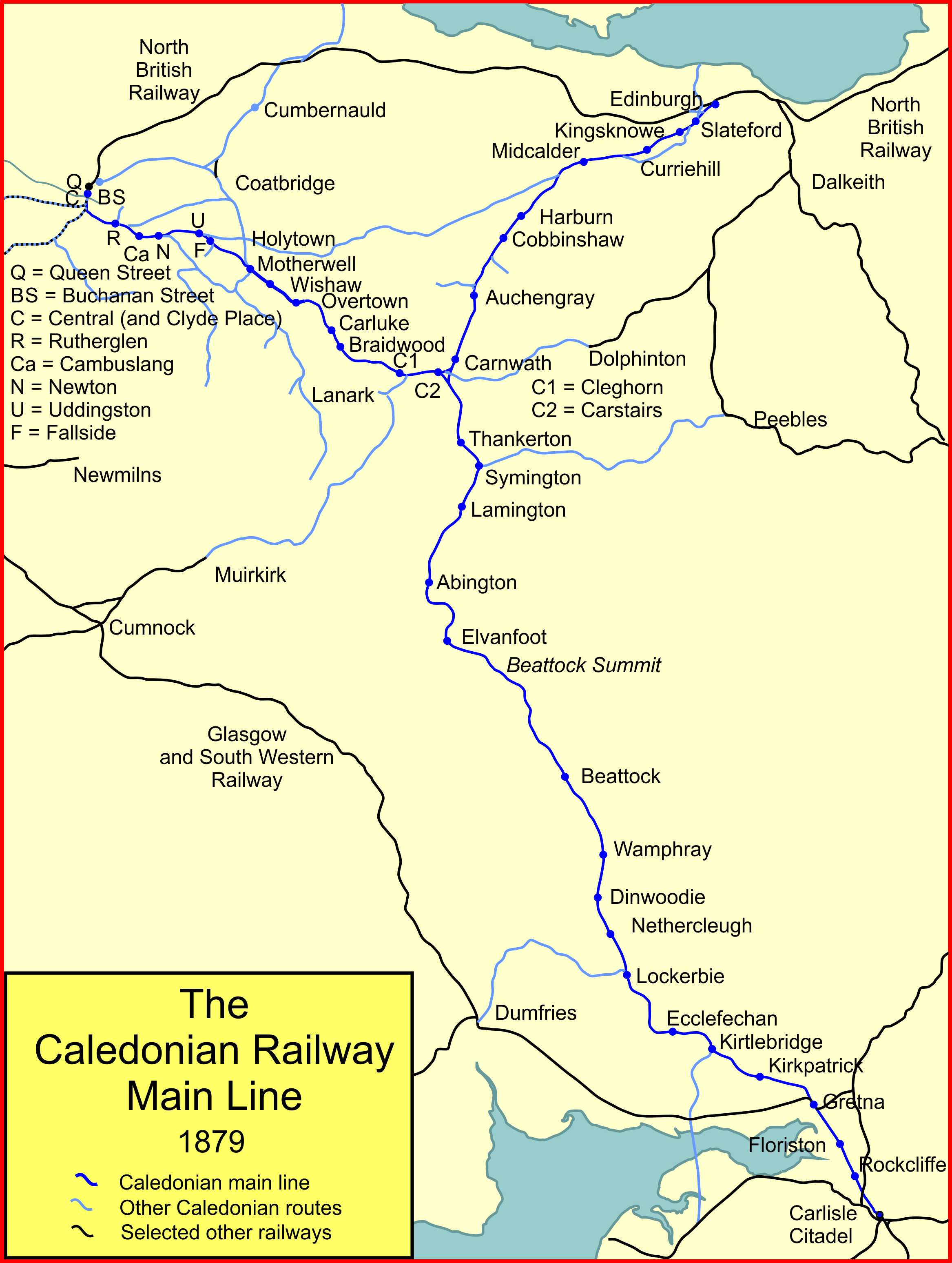
The Caledonian main line in 1879

The first main line cemented the configuration of the Caledonian Railway route to England. It was enhanced by subsequent improvement of the route into Glasgow, as well as extension of the Edinburgh terminal named Princes Street, completed in 1870 and the expansion of goods facilities in Carlisle. The final development of the route had taken place by 1879, when the Glasgow terminal at Glasgow Central was opened. The station was considerably more convenient than the terminals previously in use. The original routing over the Wishaw and Coltness and the Glasgow Garnkirk and Coatbridge lines was now by-passed for main line passenger traffic, although still in use for local passenger traffic and considerable mineral usage. The Buchanan Street terminal was now focussed on passenger services to the Stirling line.

At Carlisle the first passenger station remained in use, but the original goods facilities had been enhanced by the opening of a separate Viaduct goods station, and a route for goods and mineral trains passing the passenger station giving direct independent access from the Maryport and Carlisle Railway route; iron ore from Workington to the ironworks of the Monklands and become hugely significant by this time. The goods by-pass lines at Carlisle became very extensive and were jointly owned and operated by several railway companies.

By 1879 the shape of the Caledonian Main Line was substantially developed. Most of the branches that left the main line directly had been opened by then. The principal subsequent developments were:

- comprehensive suburban development in greater Glasgow, redoubled in the last decades of the twentieth century;
- duplication of the route from Law Junction in to Glasgow serving ironworks that later became Ravenscraig Steelworks, and giving enhanced access northwards to freight marshalling facilities at Mossend Yard;
- the opening of a branch line to Moffat Railway Beattock in 1883;
- the opening of the Leadhills and Wanlockhead Branch from Elvanfoot in 1901–1902;
- considerably enhanced goods facilities at Carlisle;
- extension lines in Edinburgh to serve docks at Granton and Leith;
- late twentieth century opening or reopening of passenger stations in the Glasgow and Edinburgh travel-to-work areas.

=== 1923–1970: Grouping and nationalisation ===
Under the terms of the Railways Act 1921 the Caledonian Railway was a constituent of the new London, Midland and Scottish Railway (LMS), as was the rival G&SWR. The LMS therefore controlled all the West Coast routes. The North British Railway was a constituent of the new London and North Eastern Railway, and controlled the East Coast route. While some consolidation took place, the basic passenger train service pattern remained relatively unaltered for many years, indeed into the post-1948 era of nationalisation under British Railways.

Electrification of the West Coast Main Line throughout between London, Birmingham and Glasgow encouraged concentration of long-distance passenger traffic on the Caledonian Main Line, and decline of the G&SWR route. The Waverley Route closed in 1969.

=== 1970–present: Electrification and modern usage ===
The Glasgow south side suburban service had been electrified by British Railways from 27 May 1962, when the Cathcart Circle, and Newton - Uddingston - Motherwell were operated electrically. Further electrification of the Hamilton circle, and to Lanark, followed and the main line southwards was being progressively wired, so that by the end of 1973 electric locomotives could be exchanged between Carlisle and Shields Depot, running for the time being via Kirkhill. From 6 May 1974 the Hamilton Circle and Lanark routes were fully available for electric passenger trains. (These trains ran to Glasgow Central High Level, as the Argyle Line had not yet been constructed.) Not all of the platforms at Glasgow Central were electrified at this stage, and when main line electrification was introduced, the remaining non-wired platforms had to be fitted.

The southern sections of the West Coast Main Line were electrified in the period to 1969. In April 1970 authorisation was given for the electrification between Weaver Junction (in Cheshire) and Cleghorn Junction (to which the Lanark electrification had already been implemented). By July 1973 the line had been resignalled throughout, and from 7 January 1974 freight trains were electrically hauled between Kingmoor Yard at Carlisle and Mossend Yard. From 22 April 1974 passenger trains were electrically hauled throughout between London and Glasgow.

While the term 'Caledonian Main Line' has no authoritative present-day definition, it is generally taken to mean the main line between Carlisle and Glasgow and Carstairs and Edinburgh. That is consistent with the first main line from Carlisle to Garriongill Junction, then following the Clydesdale Junction Railway route to Gushetfaulds, just outside South Side station, and then the later short line Glasgow Central station. The Edinburgh section runs from Carstairs to Edinburgh Waverley station; the final section of the original line to Princes Street was closed and trains diverted to Waverley.

The route is now the northern section of the West Coast Main Line, and carries a heavy passenger and freight service.

== Operations ==
In 1850, the passenger service on the main line consisted of five trains daily from Carlisle to Glasgow, of which three were expresses. Two gave daytime transits from London, the faster taking 12 hours 55 minutes. The fastest journey from Carlisle to Glasgow took 3 hours 30 minutes, and all the trains carried portions to Edinburgh detached at Carstairs, or gave connections to Edinburgh there. There was a limited Sunday service.

As train service patterns settled down later in the nineteenth century, the Caledonian Main Line carried important express trains, as well as local stopping trains. In contrast to the frequent regular-interval services of the present day, the train frequency was limited. In 1895 there were four daytime expresses northbound; the first left Euston at 5.15 a.m. Many trains divided at Carstairs with separate portions from there to Edinburgh and in some cases Perth and Aberdeen. There were two sleeping car trains to Glasgow and two to Aberdeen. All the daytime trains called at Beattock, and there were four all-stations stopping trains as well as some short workings. The fastest journey from Carlisle to Glasgow took 2 hours 10 minutes.

By 1922 there were five daytime express trains. Local passenger business had declined and there was only one all-stations train running throughout the route, but several very short workings and some semi-fast trains. The 10.00 a.m. express from Euston arrived at Glasgow Central at 6.30 p.m.; it was not named, and conveyed through carriages from Birmingham. It required 2 hours 26 minutes from Carlisle to Glasgow, calling only at Motherwell "when required". There were several night trains to Glasgow and to the northern lines.

By 1938 there were still only four daytime through trains Monday to Friday, although there were considerably more summer Saturday trains, many of them going north to Stirling and beyond, and some originating from Liverpool. The stopping service on the route remained very thin indeed, although the Edinburgh line had more stopping trains. There were many more night trains, several of them seasonal, and many running to the north of Scotland. The 10.00 a.m. train from Euston was named The Royal Scot and took seven hours to Glasgow, and seven hours and five minutes to Edinburgh, advertised as conveying restaurant car to both terminals. The train called only at Carlisle intermediately.

From electrification of the main line by British Rail in 1974 the main line service was increased to an almost-regular two-hourly frequency. The best train took five hours between London Euston and Glasgow Central, but Edinburgh was not a destination served from London by this route. Trains from Liverpool and Manchester combined at Preston and divided again at Carstairs, giving through journeys to Glasgow and Edinburgh. Beattock station had closed by this time so that only Lockerbie, Carstairs and Motherwell were served by main line trains to Glasgow, and only Haymarket by Edinburgh trains.

=== Current operations ===
At the present day the main line has a heavy long-distance passenger service to London, Birmingham and Manchester. Significant freight traffic also runs over the line. The Carstairs to Edinburgh line carries a considerable long-distance passenger service, although London to Edinburgh is not realistically dominant now, compared to the East Coast main Line service. In the Edinburgh and Glasgow travel-to-work areas there is a heavy suburban passenger service. Notable among these is the Argyle line service which runs from Lanark to North Clyde destinations through the Argyle line in Glasgow. Numerous other suburban routes operate in the greater Glasgow and Edinburgh conurbations.

Avanti West Coast is the main operator on the London and Birmingham to Glasgow route. The main line service frequency is considerably better than ever before. TransPennine Express operate a frequent service between Manchester Airport and Glasgow and Edinburgh.

== Route ==
The original main line was selected as the optimum route through challenging terrain with a very limited population density, and there was little opportunity to deviate to serve intermediate towns and villages.

Locations between Carlisle and Glasgow on the present main line route:

- Carlisle; joint station with London and North Western Railway; opened 1 or 10 September 1847; at times known as Carlisle Joint or Carlisle Citadel;
- Caldew Bridge Junction; convergence of Dentonholme goods lines;
- Port Carlisle Junction; divergence of Silloth line;
- Etterby Junction;
- Rockcliffe; opened 10 September 1847; closed 1 January 1917; reopened 2 December 1919; closed 17 July 1950 but workmen's services continued until 6 December 1965;
- Floriston; opened 10 September 1847; closed 17 July 1950;
- Gretna; opened 10 September 1847; closed 10 September 1951; at times known as Gretna Junction; convergence of North British Railway line from Longtown;
- Gretna Junction; divergence of Glasgow and South Western line to Dumfries;
- Kirkpatrick; opened 10 September 1847; closed 13 June 1960;
- Kirtlebridge; opened March 1848; relocated a mile northwards by October 1869; closed 13 June 1960; convergence of Solway Junction line;
- Ecclefechan; opened 10 September 1847; closed 13 June 1960;
- Lockerbie; opened 10 September 1847; divergence of Dumfries line;
- Nethercleugh; opened 10 September 1847; closed 13 June 1960;
- Dinwoodie; opened May 1853; closed 13 June 1960;
- Wamphray; opened 10 September 1847; closed 13 June 1960;
- Beattock; opened 10 September 1847; closed 3 January 1972; divergence of Moffat branch;
- Elvanfoot; opened April 1848; closed 4 January 1965; convergence of Wanlockhead branch;
- Crawford; opened 1 January 1891; closed 4 January 1965;
- Abington; opened 15 February 1848; closed 4 January 1965;
- Lamington: opened 15 February 1848: closed 4 January 1965:
- Symington; opened 15 February 1848; relocated northwards to serve converging Peebles branch 30 November 1863; closed 4 January 1965;
- Thankerton; opened 15 February 1848; closed 4 January 1965;
- junction; original divergence of direct line to Edinburgh;
- Strawfrank Junction; divergence of later line to Edinburgh;
- Carstairs; opened 15 February 1848; convergence of line from Edinburgh;
- Silvermuir Junction; divergence of line to Lanark;
- Cleghorn Junction; convergence of line from Lanark;
- Lanark; opened 15 February 1848; renamed Cleghorn Junction 1855; renamed Cleghorn 1864; closed 4 January 1965; replaced by the later Lanark station;
- Braidwood; opened August 1848; closed 2 July 1962;
- Carluke; opened 15 February 1848;
- Law Junction; opened December 1879 (prior to opening of diverging line); closed 4 January 1965; divergence of direct Wishaw line;
- Garriongill Junction; convergence with Wishaw and Coltness line.

On the Wishaw and Coltness Railway section:

- Overtown; opened 8 May 1843; closed 1 October 1881;
- Wishaw; opened 8 May 1843; renamed Wishaw South 1880; closed 15 September 1958;
- Flemington; opened 2 March 1891; closed 4 January 1965;
- Motherwell; W&CR station; opened 8 May 1843; closed 31 July 1885;
- junction; present main line leaves Wishaw and Coltness section.

On the Clydesdale Junction section:

- Motherwell; opened 31 July 1885;
- Lesmahagow Junction; convergence of line from Ross Junction; divergence of line towards Mossend;
- Fallside; opened August 1872; closed 1 January 1917; reopened 1 May 1919; closed 3 August 1953;
- Uddingston Junction; convergence of line from Mossend;
- Uddingston; opened 1 June 1849; renamed Uddingston Central for some time;
- Hamilton Junction; convergence of line from Hamilton;
- Newton; opened November 1852; relocated 19 December 1873; divergence of lines to Carmyle and Cathcart;
- Cambuslang; opened 1 June 1849;
- Rutherglen Junction; convergence of Coatbridge line;
- Rutherglen; opened 1 June 1849; relocated 31 March 1879; divergence of Argyle Line;
- Rutherglen West Junction; convergence of line from Dalmarnock;
- Gushetfaulds Junction; divergence of original line to South Side;
- Cathcart Road; opened 6 April 1885; renamed Gushetfaulds 1886; closed 1 May 1907;
- Larkfield Junction; divergence of line to Langside Junction;

Section built by the Caledonian Railway;

- Eglinton Street; opened 1 July 1879; closed 1 February 1965;
- Bridge Street; opened 14 July 1840 (for Glasgow Paisley and Ayr Railway); closed 1 March 1905;
- Glasgow Central; opened 1 August 1879.

Locations between Carstairs and Edinburgh on the present main line route:

- Carstairs; see above;
- Dolphinton Junction; convergence of line from Strawfrank Junction and divergence of Dolphinton branch;
- Carnwath; opened 15 February 1848; closed 18 April 1966;
- Auchengray; opened 15 February 1848; closed 18 April 1966;
- Wilsontown Junctions; for Wilsontown branch;
- Cobbinshaw; opened October 1874; relocated 4 October 1875; closed 18 April 1966;
- West Calder and Torphin; opened 15 February 1848; renamed West Calder and Harburn, then Harburn; closed 18 April 1966;
- Midcalder Junction; convergence of line from Shotts;
- Midcalder; opened 18 February 1848; rename Kirknewton 1982;
- Camps Junction; convergence of Camps branch;
- Ravelrig Junction; divergence of Balerno line;
- Ravelrig; opened 4 April 1884 unadvertised for volunteer purposes; in public timetable from May 1889; closed June 1920; reopened 1927 to serve Golf Club; closed in 1930;
- Currie; opened 15 February 1848; renamed Curriehill 1874; closed 2 April 1951; reopened 5 October 1987
- Slateford; opened 15 February 1848; renamed Kings Knowes 1 January 1853; later Kingsknowe; closed 1 January 1917; reopened 1 February 1919; closed 6 July 1964; reopened 1 February 1971;
- Slateford; opened 1 January 1853;
- Slateford Junction; divergence of line to Edinburgh Suburban line and divergence from Princes Street line;
- Granton Junction; divergence of Granton Harbour line;
- Haymarket Junction; convergence with former Edinburgh and Glasgow Railway route;
- Haymarket;
- Edinburgh Waverley.

=== Gradients ===
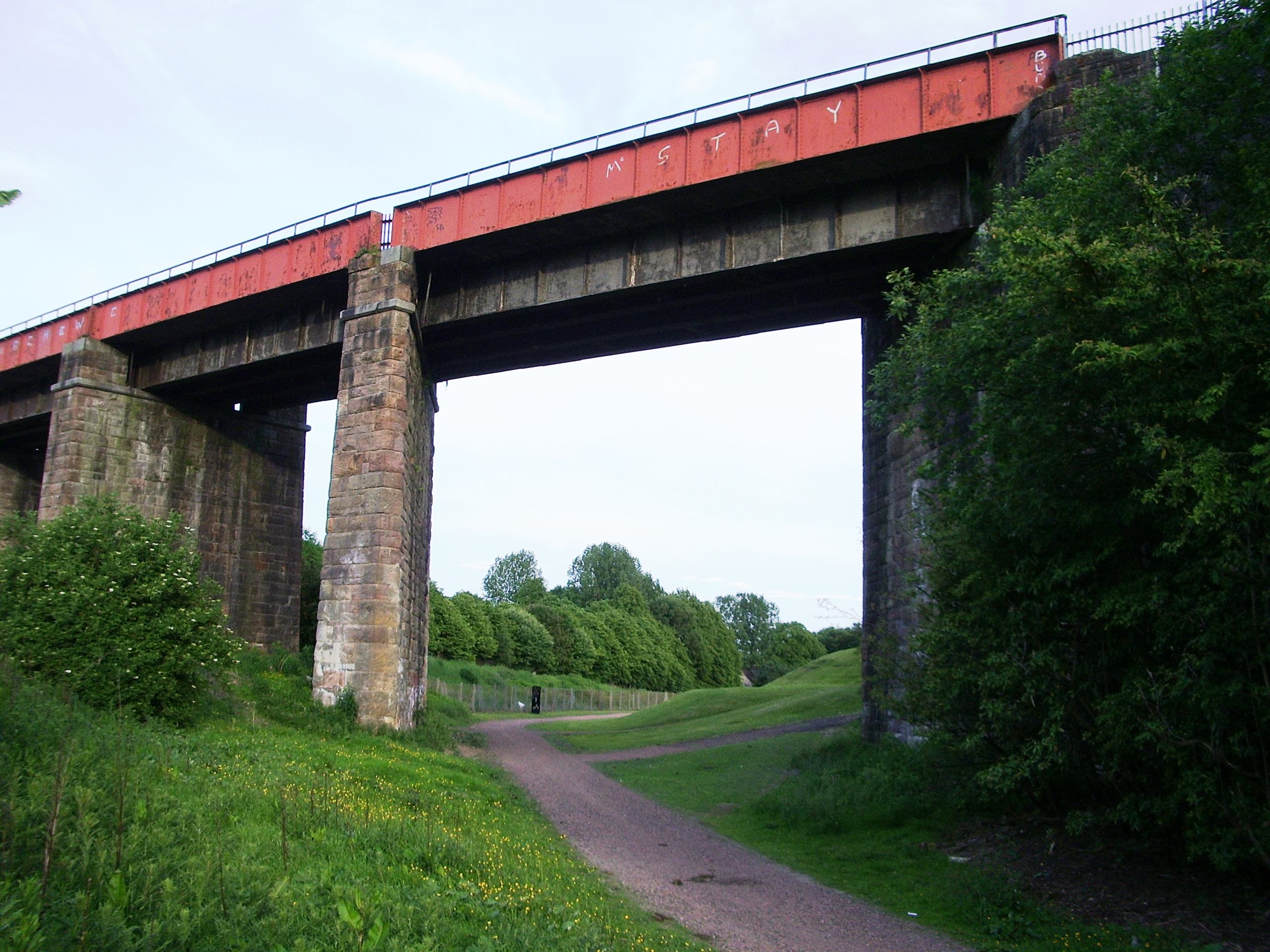
The Caledonian Viaduct, over the route of the Monkland Canal at Coatbridge

When the main line was conceived, there were misgivings about the capacity of the locomotive power of the day to handle trains over the heavy gradients approaching Beattock summit. By the time the line was opened, the technology of locomotive design had improved, and locomotive haulage was practicable. Nonetheless, Beattock summit remained a significant operational limitation, and the provision of assistant engines for all but the lightest trains was routine from Beattock station to the summit throughout the era of steam traction.

Leaving Carlisle, gradients were moderate until just before Gretna, from where a climb of 1 in 193 - 1 in 200 started as far as Castlemilk, beyond Ecclefechan. A slight decline then followed to Nethercleugh, where the climb resumed, stiffening again to 1 in 202 after Wamphray. At Beattock the serious climbing started with a gradient of 1 in 88 increasing to 1 in 74 for ten miles to Beattock Summit. A short fall of 1 in 89 for two miles to Elvanfoot followed. From there however the descent was more gentle and longer, at a typical gradient of 1 in 240 although with several short steeper sections. This reached as far as Carstairs, after which an eight-mile climb followed. There then followed a stiffer descent of up to 1 in 102 for sixteen miles to Uddingston. From there moderate undulations led to Glasgow Central station.

The Carstairs to Edinburgh line had difficult gradients too. From Carstairs there was a climb of 1 in 225 stiffening to 1 in 97 as far as Cobbinshaw (eleven miles) then descending at 1 in 100 for five miles, slackening to 1 in 143 almost continuously as far as Edinburgh.

=== Quintinshill ===
Quintinshill, 1.3 kilometres (0.81 mi) north of Gretna Green, was the site of the Quintinshill rail crash, which occurred at 6.49am on 22 May 1915.

== Sources ==
- Awdry, Christopher (1990). Encyclopaedia of British Railway Companies. Sparkford: Patrick Stephens Ltd. ISBN 1-8526-0049-7. OCLC 19514063. CN 8983.
- Jowett, Alan (March 1989). Jowett's Railway Atlas of Great Britain and Ireland: From Pre-Grouping to the Present Day (1st ed.). Sparkford: Patrick Stephens Ltd. ISBN 978-1-85260-086-0. OCLC 22311137.
- Jowett, Alan (2000). Jowett's Nationalised Railway Atlas (1st ed.). Penryn, Cornwall: Atlantic Transport Publishers. ISBN 978-0-906899-99-1. OCLC 228266687.
- Heap, Christine; Riemsdijk, John van; Science Museum (1985). The pre-grouping railways : their development, and individual characters. London: Her Majesty's Stationery Office. ISBN 0-1129-0432-7. OCLC 19513618.
- Nock, Oswald; Cross, Derek (1960). Main Lines Across the Border (1st ed.). London: Nelson. OCLC 12273673.
- Nock, Oswald; Cross, Derek (1982). Main Lines Across the Border (Revised ed.). Shepperton: Ian Allan. ISBN 0-7110-1118-4. OCLC 11622324.
- Rolt, L. T. C.; Kichenside, G. M. (1982). Red for Danger: A history of railway accidents and railway safety (4th ed.). Newton Abbot, Devon: David & Charles. ISBN 0-7153-8362-0. OCLC 9526651.
- Robertson, C. J. A. (1983). The Origins of the Scottish Railway System: 1722-1844 (1st ed.). Edinburgh: John Donald Publishers Ltd. ISBN 0-8597-6088-X.
- Thomas, John (1971). A Regional History of the Railways of Great Britain. Vol. VI Scotland: The Lowlands and the Borders (1st ed.). Newton Abbot, Devon: David & Charles. ISBN 0-7153-5408-6. OCLC 16198685.
- Thomas, John; Paterson, Rev A. J. S. (1984). A Regional History of the Railways of Great Britain. Vol. VI Scotland: The Lowlands and the Borders (2nd ed.). Newton Abbott, Devon: David & Charles. ISBN 0-9465-3712-7. OCLC 12521072.
