= Dumfries, Lochmaben and Lockerbie Railway =

Railway line in the UK

Overview
- Status: absorbed by Caledonian Railway
- Locale: Scotland

History
- Opened: 1 September 1863
- Closed: 18 April 1966

Technical
- Track gauge: 1,435 mm (4 ft 8 1/2 in)

The Dumfries, Lochmaben and Lockerbie Railway was a railway in Dumfriesshire, Scotland. It connected Dumfries with Lockerbie via Lochmaben. Promoted independently, it was absorbed by the Caledonian Railway to give access to Dumfriesshire and later to Portpatrick for the Irish ferry service. It opened in 1863, closed to ordinary passenger services in 1952, and closed completely in 1966.

== History ==
=== Before the local railway ===
In the first years of the nineteenth century, the area round Lochmaben was agricultural. The Burgh of Dumfries was dominant in the area, and the stage route between Carlisle and Glasgow and Edinburgh ran through Lockerbie. There had traditionally been significant trade movement along the Lockerbie—Lochmaben—Dumfries road.

In 1847 the Caledonian Railway (CR) opened its main line through Lockerbie. In 1848 a line between Carlisle and Dumfries was opened, and was extended to complete a Carlisle—Dumfries—Kilmarnock—Glasgow route in 1849; the company building that route became the Glasgow and South Western Railway (G&SWR) in 1850.

The arrival of the railway brought cheap coal to the communities served, and helped farmers by cheaply bringing fertiliser in and farm produce away. Lochmaben felt itself at a disadvantage to its neighbours, four miles (Lockerbie) and six miles (Dumfries) away. The populations in 1850 were Lochmaben: 3,100; Dumfries: 11,000; and Lockerbie (in 1851) 1,569.

=== The line authorised ===
Dumfries, Lochmaben and Lockerby Junction Railway Act 1860
- Act of Parliament
- Parliament of the United Kingdom
- Long title: An Act for making a Railway commencing by a Junction with the Glasgow and South-western Railway at or near the North or North-east End of the Passenger Station of that Railway at the Town of Dumfries, and terminating by a Junction with the Caledonian Railway at or near the North End of the Lockerby Station on that Line; and for other Purposes.
- Citation: 23 & 24 Vict. c. lxxxiii

Dates
- Royal assent: 14 June 1860

Dumfries, Lochmaben and Lockerby Junction Railway Deviation Act 1861
- Act of Parliament
- Parliament of the United Kingdom
- Long title: An Act to enable the Dumfries, Lochmaben, and Lockerby Junction Railway Company to divert their authorized Line of Railway; and for other Purposes.
- Citation: 24 & 25 Vict. c. clxiii

Dates
- Royal assent: 22 July 1861

Local interests promoted an independent line between Lockerbie and Dumfries, and the Dumfries, Lochmaben and Lockerby Junction Railway Act 1860 (23 & 24 Vict. c. lxxxiii) authorising the Dumfries, Lochmaben and Lockerby Junction Railway received royal assent on 14 June 1860; the authorised capital was £85,000 in £10 shares, with borrowing powers of £28,300.

The promoters wished to have an independent passenger station in Dumfries, but the G&SWR opposed this and the House of Lords committee agreed, obliging the DL&LR to use the G&SWR station.

The CR was happy to see the line promoted locally, considering that it would give it access to Dumfries, and fearing that the G&SWR would be hostile to a line directly promoted directly by them.

=== Construction and opening ===
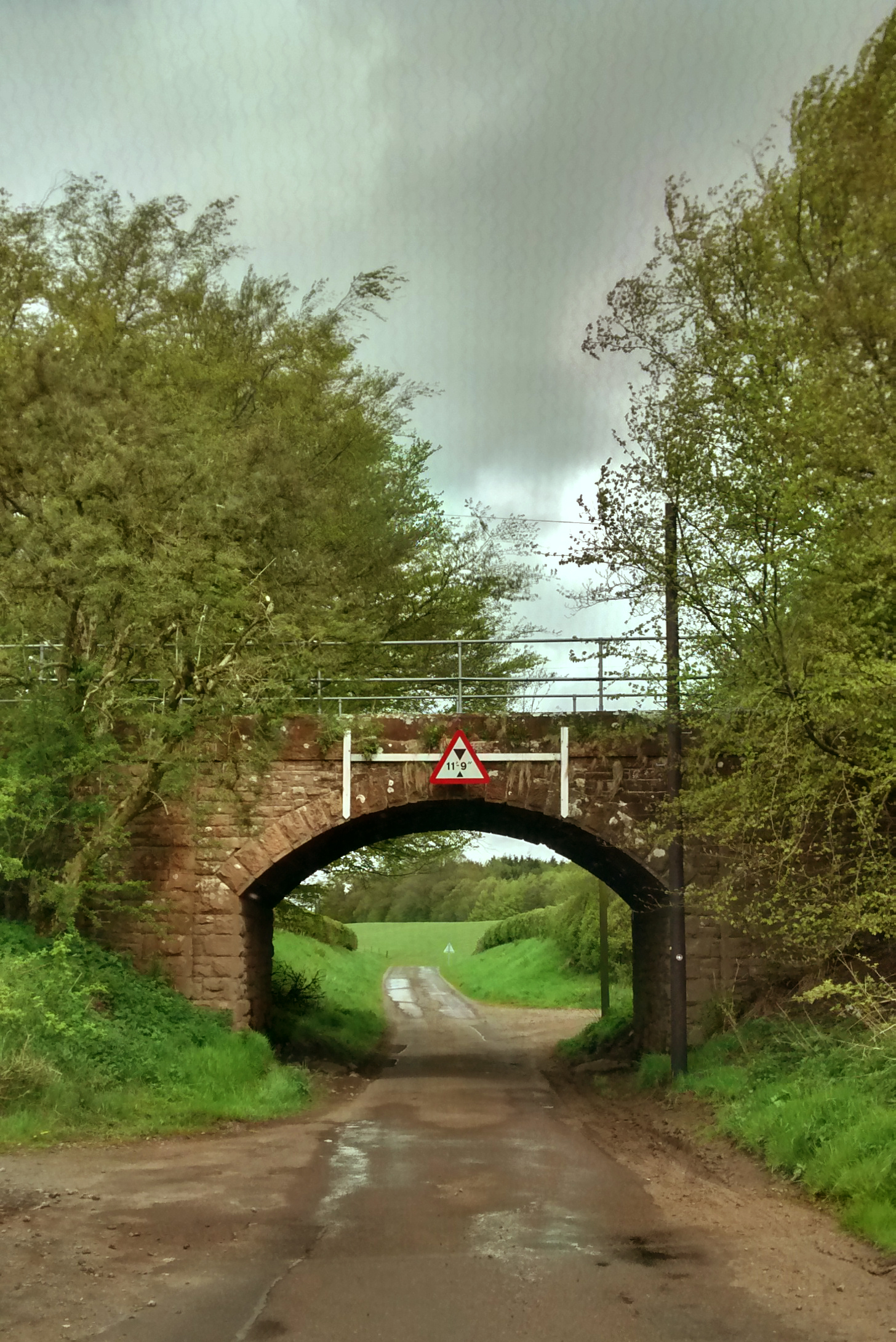
A bridge survives outside Lockerbie.

B. & H. Blyth of Edinburgh designed and built the line, and services started on 1 September 1863. It was 14½ miles (23 km) long. At Dumfries passenger trains crossed the G&SWR main line on the flat to join the Castle Douglas and Dumfries Railway (CD&DR), which ran parallel to the G&SWR line and on its west side; the CD&DR lines ran to north-facing bay platforms on the west side of Dumfries passenger station, and local passenger trains ran to a bay platform at Dumfries. The DL&LJR set up an independent goods station, named St Mary's, on the east side of the G&SWR line. The Caledonian Railway worked the line from the outset.

There were five return passenger journeys a day stopping at all stations at first.

=== An early interlocking ===
When the CD&DR line opened, the points and signals at Dumfries were operated by a "pointsman" on the ground there. When the DL&LR line was constructed, a very early interlocking was installed. The opportunity was taken to relocate the pointsman's place of duty at

the summit of the slope at the deep cutting north of Dumfries station. The Castle Douglas and Lockerbie railways formed junctions with the G&SWR line in the cutting opposite the pointsman's tower... The points at the sidings and junctions will be worked from the top of this bank by means of rods and levers... The semaphores for each line will be connected with the levers which work the points, and consequently when the pointsman shifts the points, the semaphore is made by the same movement to show the proper signal.

=== The Caledonian Railway takes over ===
In 1861 the Portpatrick Railway (PPR) opened its line from Castle Douglas to Stranraer, and arranged for the Caledonian Railway to work their line. Although the G&SWR was strongly opposed, a parliamentary bill was prepared by the PPR, seeking running powers over the Castle Douglas and Dumfries Railway and the short section of the G&SWR at Dumfries, so as to enable through running from Lockerbie to Stranraer, with a reversal at Dumfries G&SWR station. (Portpatrick had been reduced in importance in favour of Stranraer as the port for the north of Ireland.) The bill was passed by Parliament and became the Portpatrick Railway (No. 1) Act 1864 (27 & 28 Vict. c. cccxvii) on 29 July 1864, and the working arrangement with the CR took effect on 4 December 1864. This gave the CR access to the traffic from the north of Ireland, which was the shortest sea route, between Donaghadee and Stranraer. The CR were able to insist that traffic from Stranraer to Glasgow and Edinburgh was routed over their own line via Lockerbie, using the DL&LR.

Caledonian and Dumfries, Lochmaben and Lockerby Junction Railways Amalgamation Act 1865
- Act of Parliament
- Parliament of the United Kingdom
- Long title: An Act to authorize the Amalgamation of the Dumfries, Lochmaben, and Lockerby Junction Railway Company with the Caledonian Railway Company; and for other Purposes.
- Citation: 28 & 29 Vict. c. ccxcvii

Dates
- Royal assent: 5 July 1865

Text of statute as originally enacted

It was an obvious next step to absorb the DL&LR, and the Caledonian and Dumfries, Lochmaben and Lockerby Junction Railways Amalgamation Act 1865 (28 & 29 Vict. c. ccxcvii) became effective on 5 July 1865. The CR also wanted a share of the lucrative ferry traffic going to Ireland via Portpatrick.

At this period, the CR proposed to build a line from Lochmaben to Dinwoodie, on the West Coast Main Line several miles to the north of Lockerbie, to make a more direct connection from Dumfries to the north; this would have avoided the reversal at Lockerbie, but the scheme was not proceeded with.

In the years leading to 1876 passengers from Stranraer to London by the evening boat train went via Annan on the G&SWR to Carlisle, joining an LNWR train there. The arrival of the Midland Railway at Carlisle on completion of the Settle and Carlisle Line, and the alliance between the MR and the G&SWR, meant that boat train passengers could join a London through train at Dumfries. Accordingly the Caledonian arranged for the boat train to continue from Dumfries (where it had formerly terminated) to Lockerbie; there a through sleeping car was attached to the Up Perth mail train, giving an arrival in Euston at 8 am. The time penalty incurred by the extra mileage was viewed with disfavour by other partners in the service, particularly the ferry operator which was competing with other routes between Ireland and Britain.

The working arrangement on the Portpatrick Railway expired in 1885 and the railway, together with the Wigtownshire Railway, was purchased jointly by four larger concerns: the London and North Western Railway, the MR, the G&SWR and the CR. Vesting day for the new joint railway was 1 January 1886; it was called the Portpatrick and Wigtownshire Joint Railways. As a result the bitter competition between the CR and the G&SWR for London traffic was diminished, and the boat trains were routed via Annan; the Lochmaben route reverted to the status of a local line.

== After 1923 ==
The line stagnated under the London, Midland and Scottish Railway after the 1921 Grouping. It passed to the Scottish Region of British Railways on nationalisation in 1948, and closed to regular passenger services on 19 May 1952.

In 1957 the signalling at Dumfries was modernized when a new station box was opened controlling the whole of the area at the north end of the station. As part of the scheme a signalbox controlling the entrance to St Mary's goods yard, from the Lockerbie line, was abolished.

A few special passenger trains used the line in the early 1960s, and the line was closed to all traffic on 18 April 1966.

== Traction in World War II ==
David L Smith noted that there was a tremendous amount of traffic to be handled at Dumfries during World War II with locomotive power augmented accordingly. "For the line to Lockerbie they had sent down a L&NW push-and-pull outfit, with a Webb 2-4-2 tank. Besides its Lockerbie activities, the push-and-pull did at least one turn on the main line. I noted No. 6639 on it several times."

== Traces of the line today ==
The outer wall of the company's trainshed still stands at Lockerbie railway station. The goods terminus was known as Dumfries St Mary's and is now St Mary's Industrial Estate. The line from Dumfries to Locharbriggs is now a cycle path called Caledonian Cycleway (a reference to the line's owners, the Caledonian Railway), and the trackbed is still visible near Amisfield.

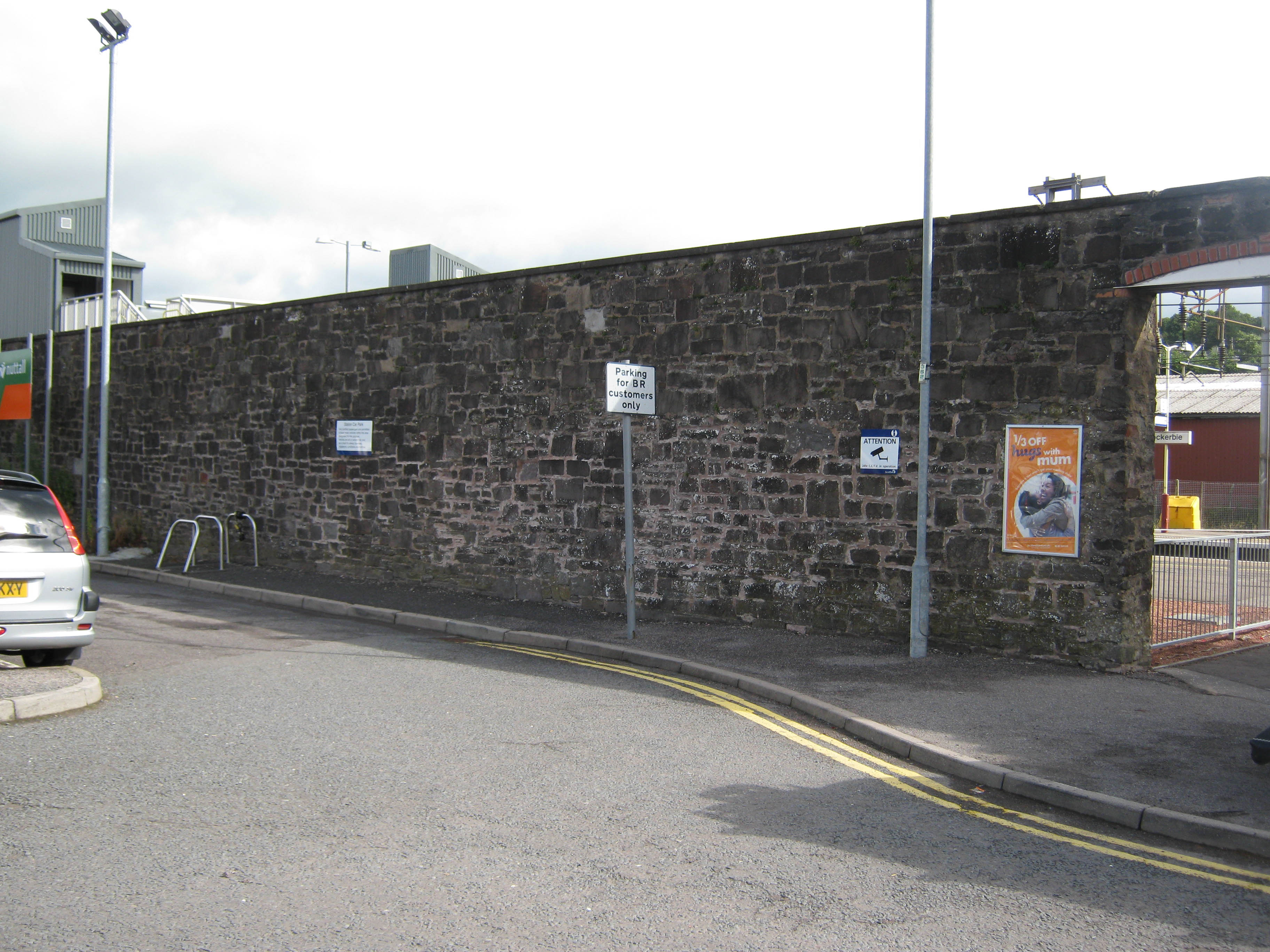
The remains of the Dumfries, Lochmaben and Lockerbie Railway's trainshed at Lockerbie

== Route ==
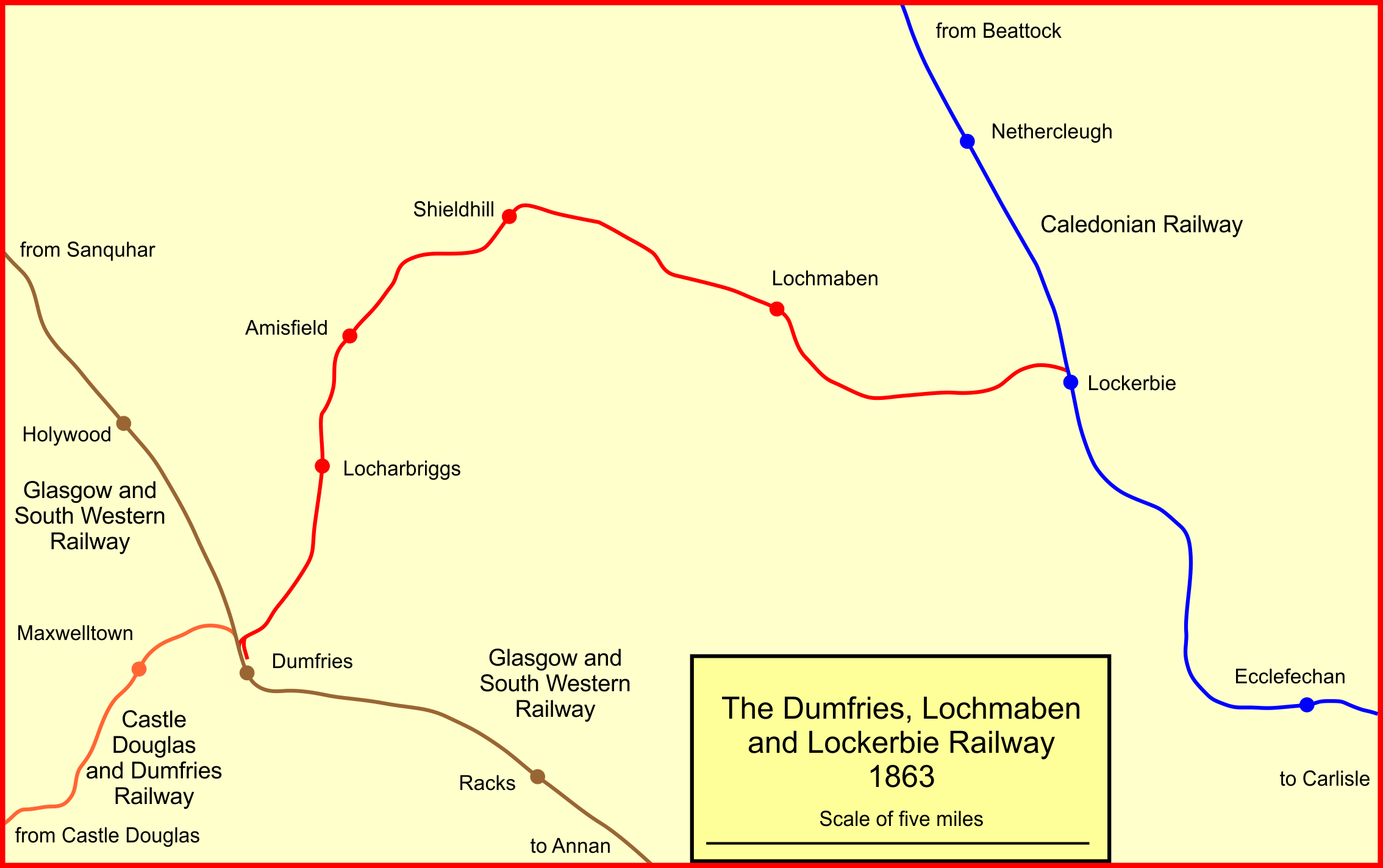
System map of the Dumfries Lochmaben and Lockerbie Railway

The line left the Caledonian Railway main line immediately north of Lockerbie station in a northward direction, then curving west and crossing the River Annan. Now curving north-west it passed through Lochmaben station, then skirting the south bank of the Water of Ae and turning south-west through Shieldhill station and then Amisfield station. Now running almost due south, the line reached Locharbriggs, where there was later an extensive quarry. The line then turned to the south-west and joined the G&SWR main line immediately north of Dumfries. There was a flat junction with that line a short distance south of the geographical junction with the Castle Douglas line. The Caledonian Railway constructed a large goods yard to the north-east of the G&SWR passenger station, accessed by a spur east of the junction with the G&SWR. An engine turntable was provided there.

The line was single throughout.

The passenger stations were:

- Lockerbie, on the Caledonian Railway main line;
- Lochmaben;
- Shieldhill;
- Amisfield;
- Locharbriggs;
- Dumfries, G&SWR station

Lockerbie and Dumfries stations are still open; the intermediate stations closed to passengers on 19 May 1952.

== 1883 collision at Lockerbie ==
On 14 May 1883, at 11:35 pm, a train from Stranraer passed at danger the signal protecting the main line at Lockerbie, and collided at low speed with a northbound goods train on the main line. The collision took place immediately north of Lockerbie station. The collision was relatively mild, but the Up line was obstructed, and an Up express passenger train collided with them, being derailed onto the station platform. Seven people were killed, including the driver and fireman of the express, and 300 people were injured.

The guard of the express train ran back down the line to warn another approaching Up express train of the accident, preventing a further collision. The driver of the first train, the Lockerbie station master and the District Inspector were all criticised in the subsequent report on the crash.

== Connections to other railways ==
- Caledonian Main Line, north of Lockerbie
- Glasgow, Dumfries and Carlisle Railway, north of Dumfries
