= Lockerbie railway station =

Railway station in Dumfries and Galloway, Scotland

Lockerbie Scottish Gaelic: Locarbaidh
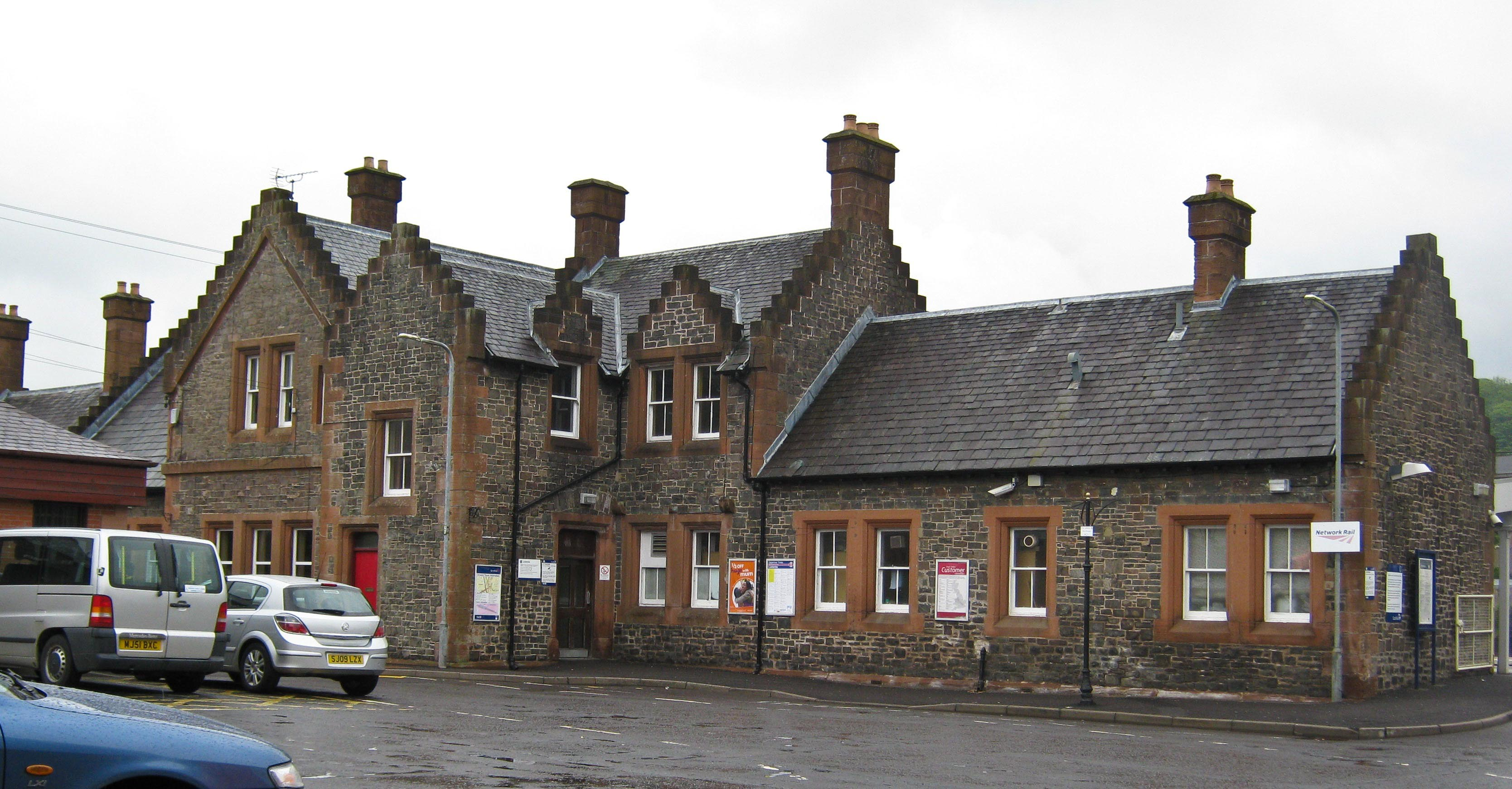
- The exterior of Lockerbie station in June 2010

General information
- Location: Lockerbie, Dumfries and Galloway, Scotland
- Coordinates: 55.1231°N 3.3541°W
- Grid reference: NY137817
- Manager: ScotRail
- Platforms: 2

Other information
- Station code: LOC

History
- Original company: Caledonian Railway
- Pre-grouping: Caledonian Railway
- Post-grouping: LMS

Key dates
- 10 September 1847: Station opened

Passengers
- 2021/22: ▲0.159 million
- 2022/23: ▼0.111 million
- 2023/24: ▲0.156 million
- 2024/25: ▲0.211 million
- 2025/26: ▲0.232 million
Location
Notes
- Passenger statistics from the Office of Rail and Road

Lockerbie railway station serves the town of Lockerbie, in Dumfries and Galloway, Scotland. It is a stop on the West Coast Main Line, located 75 miles (121 kilometres) south of Glasgow Central and 324 miles (521 kilometres) north of London Euston. The station is owned by Network Rail and is managed by ScotRail.

== History ==
The station was opened along with the first section of the Caledonian Railway's main line from Carlisle in September 1847. The line initially terminated at Beattock, but was completed through to Glasgow and Edinburgh early the following year. A branch line from here to Dumfries via Lochmaben was completed in September 1863; this was constructed by the independent Dumfries, Lochmaben & Lockerbie Railway, but was absorbed by the Caledonian company two years later. Though this route allowed the Caledonian company to reach Dumfries and thus compete with the rival Glasgow and South Western Railway, it never developed beyond country branch status.

On 4 May 1882, an accident occurred when the branch service from Stranraer via the Dumfries, Lochmaben and Lockerbie Railway passed a signal and entered the station at 23:25. It collided at low speed, with a goods train already on the northbound line. This collision, though minor, forced carriages from the goods train onto the southbound line and into the path of the speeding Glasgow Express, which smashed into the wreckage and derailed onto the station platform. Seven people were killed, including the driver and fireman of the express. The guard from the express ran down the line to warn another approaching train of the accident and prevented a further collision. There were 300 injuries. The driver of the first train, the Lockerbie stationmaster and the local inspection regime were all criticised for their actions in the subsequent report on the crash.

The branch to Dumfries was closed to passenger services by the British Transport Commission in May 1952. Goods traffic continued until 1966, when the line fell victim to the Beeching Axe. With the exception of Lockerbie, all other local stations on the main line between Carlisle Citadel and Carstairs were closed during the 1960s. Electrically operated passenger services began through this station in May 1974, when the West Coast Main Line electrification project between Weaver Junction and Glasgow was completed.

Services northwards to Glasgow Central and Edinburgh Waverley suspended in January 2016 and replaced by buses, whilst major repairs were carried out the River Clyde viaduct at Lamington that was damaged by Storm Frank. Trains resumed on 22 February 2016.

In May 2026, open access operator Lumo started serving the station with a direct Stirling to London Euston service.

== Services ==
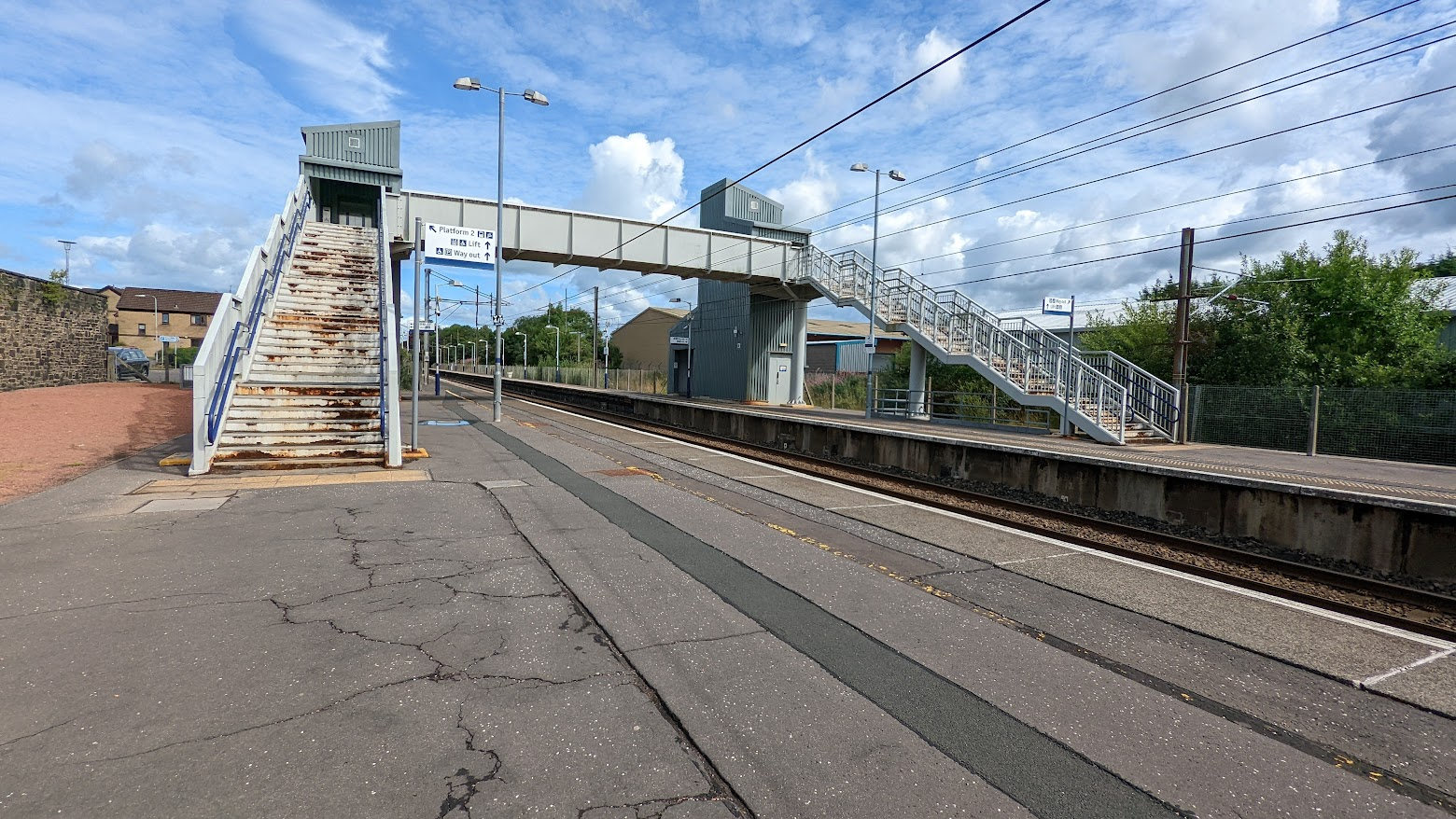
Lockerbie station with its footbridge in July 2022, with new lifts so both platforms are accessible

Lockerbie station is managed by ScotRail, although the company does not provide any services to or from the station. It is one of only two National Rail railway stations in Scotland not served by ScotRail trains; the other is Reston.

Services are provided by three train operating companies, with the following general off-peak pattern in trains per hour (tph) / day (tpd):

=== Avanti West Coast ===
- 3 tpd to Glasgow Central, with 2tpd on Saturdays and 1tpd on Sundays
- 2 tpd to London Euston, with 1tpd on Sundays
- 1 tpd to Crewe, except Saturdays.

=== TransPennine Express ===
- 1 tph to Manchester Airport
- 3 tpd to Liverpool Lime Street
- 1 train every two hours to Edinburgh Waverley
- 1 train every two hours to Glasgow Central (from Manchester Airport)
- 3 tpd to Glasgow Central (from Liverpool Lime Street).

=== Lumo ===
- 4 tpd (3 tpd on Sundays) to London Euston
- 4 tpd (3 tpd on Sundays) to Stirling

Preceding station	National Rail	Following station
Carlisle	Avanti West Coast; London / Birmingham - Glasgow	Motherwell or Glasgow Central
Carlisle	Avanti West Coast; London / Birmingham - Edinburgh	Haymarket
Carlisle	TransPennine Express; Liverpool/Preston-Glasgow	Motherwell or Glasgow Central
Carlisle	TransPennine Express; Manchester/Preston-Glasgow	Carstairs or Motherwell or Glasgow Central
Carlisle	TransPennine Express; Manchester/Preston-Edinburgh	Haymarket
Carlisle	Lumo; London Euston to Stirling	Motherwell
	Historical railways	
Ecclefechan	Caledonian Railway; Main Line	Nethercleugh
Terminus	Caledonian Railway; Dumfries, Lochmaben and Lockerbie Railway	Lochmaben
