= Dunlop railway station =

Railway station in East Ayrshire, Scotland

Dunlop Scottish Gaelic: Dùn Lob
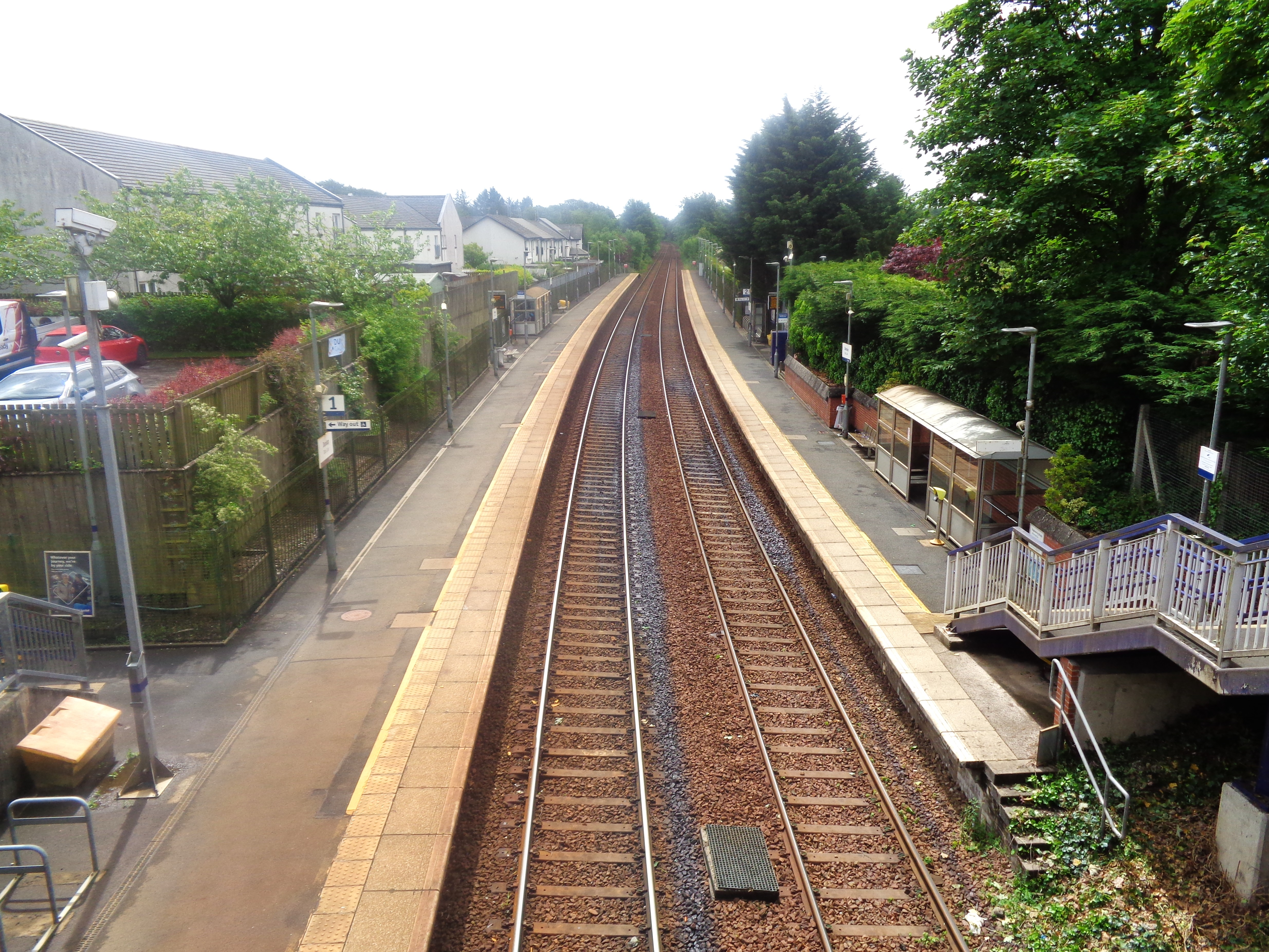
- View south towards Stewarton

General information
- Location: Dunlop, East Ayrshire; Scotland
- Coordinates: 55.7119°N 4.5324°W
- Grid reference: NS409494
- Manager: ScotRail
- Transit authority: SPT
- Platforms: 2

Other information
- Station code: DNL

History
- Original company: Glasgow, Barrhead and Kilmarnock Joint Railway
- Pre-grouping: Caledonian and Glasgow & South Western Railways

Key dates
- 27 March 1871: Opened
- 7 November 1966: Closed
- 8 June 1967: Re-opened
- 1975: Line singled and one platform taken out of service
- 2009: Track re-doubled and second platform reinstated

Passengers
- 2020/21: ▼11,792
- 2021/22: ▲42,972
- 2022/23: ▲57,782
- 2023/24: ▲66,244
- 2024/25: ▲76,002
Location
Notes
- Passenger statistics from the Office of Rail and Road

Dunlop railway station serves the village of Dunlop in East Ayrshire, Scotland. The station is managed by ScotRail and is on the Glasgow South Western Line.

== History ==
The station was opened on 27 March 1871 by the Glasgow, Barrhead and Kilmarnock Joint Railway. The station closed on 7 November 1966 as part of the Beeching cuts, however the closure was only brief as it reopened as an unstaffed halt on 8 June 1967 after vehement local opposition and national press coverage.

Track doubling between Lugton and Lochridge Junction just south of Stewarton, started in 2008, has resulted in a second platform, disabled access and a new car park being built.

== Facilities ==
The station has two platforms, with platform one for southbound services and platform two for northbound. The station is unstaffed, with help points located on both platforms. A self-service ticket vending machine is provided on platform two only. Both platforms are accessible, by means of level-street entry on the northbound platform, and ramped access on the southbound platform. Benches and sheltered waiting areas are provided on both platforms.

== Services ==
Since 13 December 2009 the station has had a mainly half-hourly service each way to Glasgow and Kilmarnock respectively, with some southbound trains continuing to either Carlisle, Girvan and Stranraer.

Monday to Saturday services consist of a 30-minute service to Glasgow (1 calling at Barrhead, then express thereafter, the other serving all stations) and to Kilmarnock (with some Carlisle trains and a limited service to Stranraer). On Sundays, an hourly service operates, with two trains continuing to Carlisle in the afternoon/evening.

In 2012, a ticket machine was installed on Platform 2, and from December 2012, Sunday trains only use Platform 1.

Preceding station	National Rail	Following station
Stewarton	ScotRail; Glasgow South Western Line	Barrhead
	Historical railways	
Stewarton	Caledonian and Glasgow & South Western Railways; Glasgow, Barrhead and Kilmarnock Joint Railway	Lugton; Line open; station closed

== Gallery ==
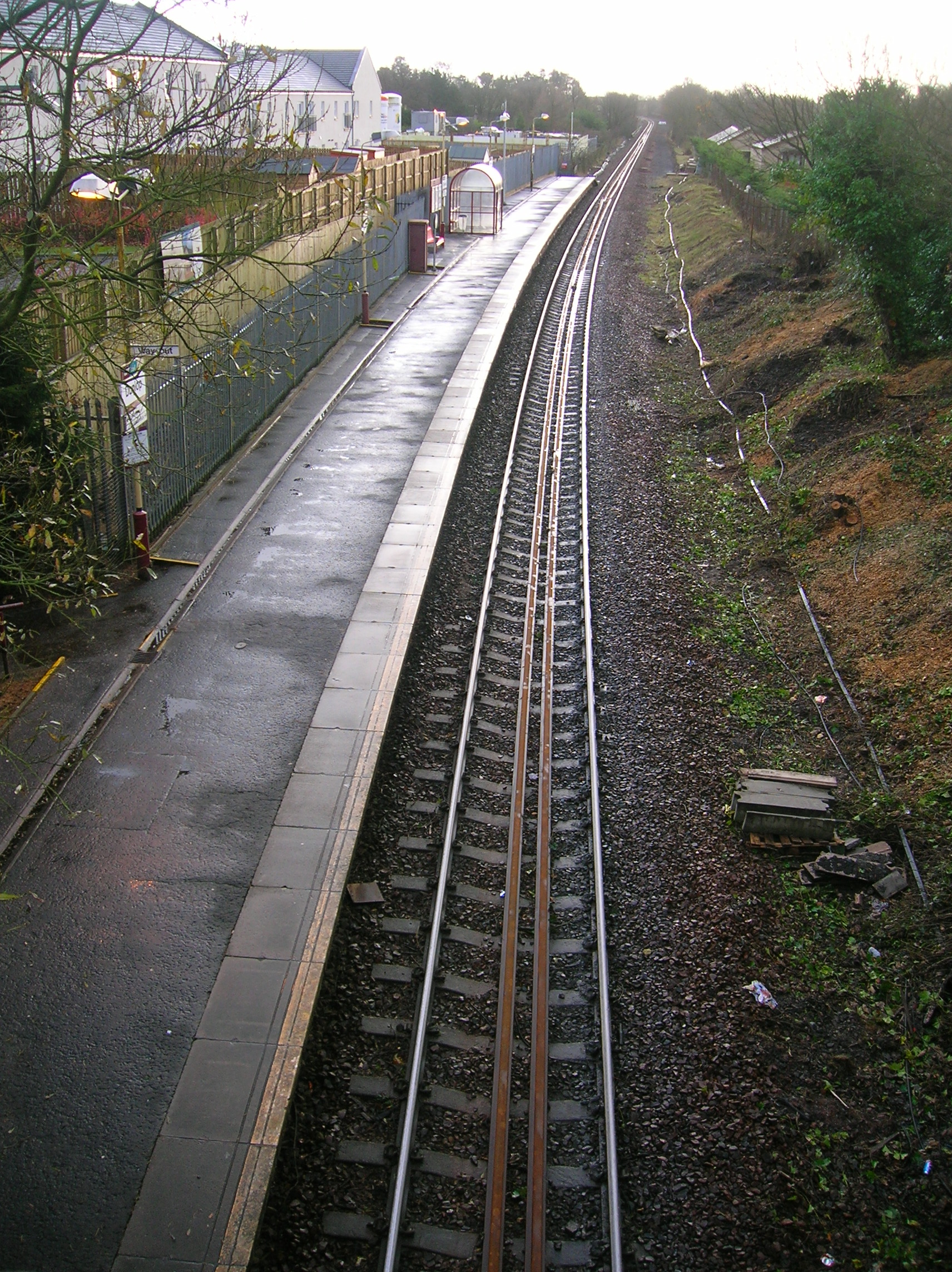
Dunlop station with the Hapland Mill housing scheme and preparatory works for the track and platform doubling in 2008

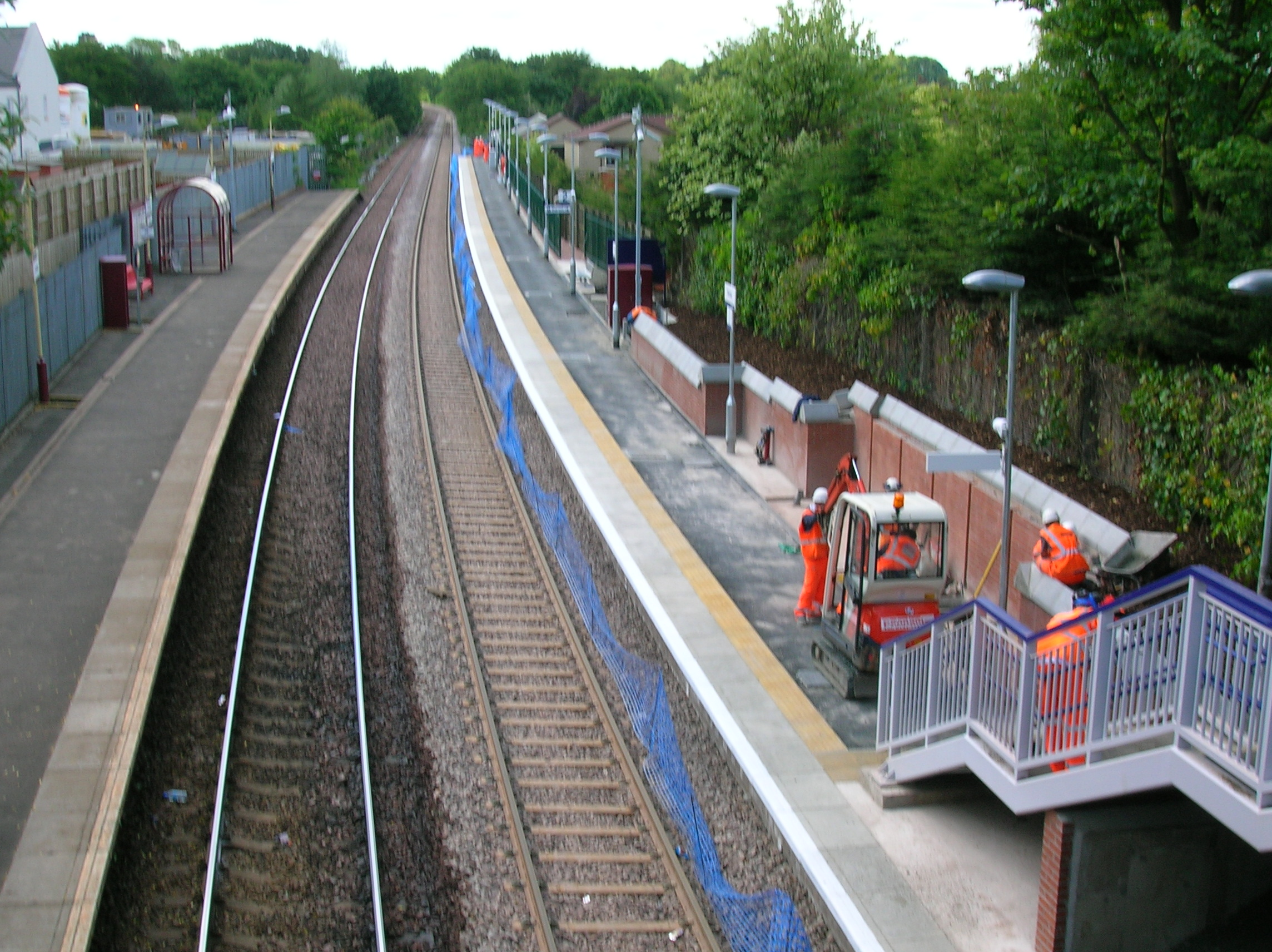
The new platform nearing completion in June 2009

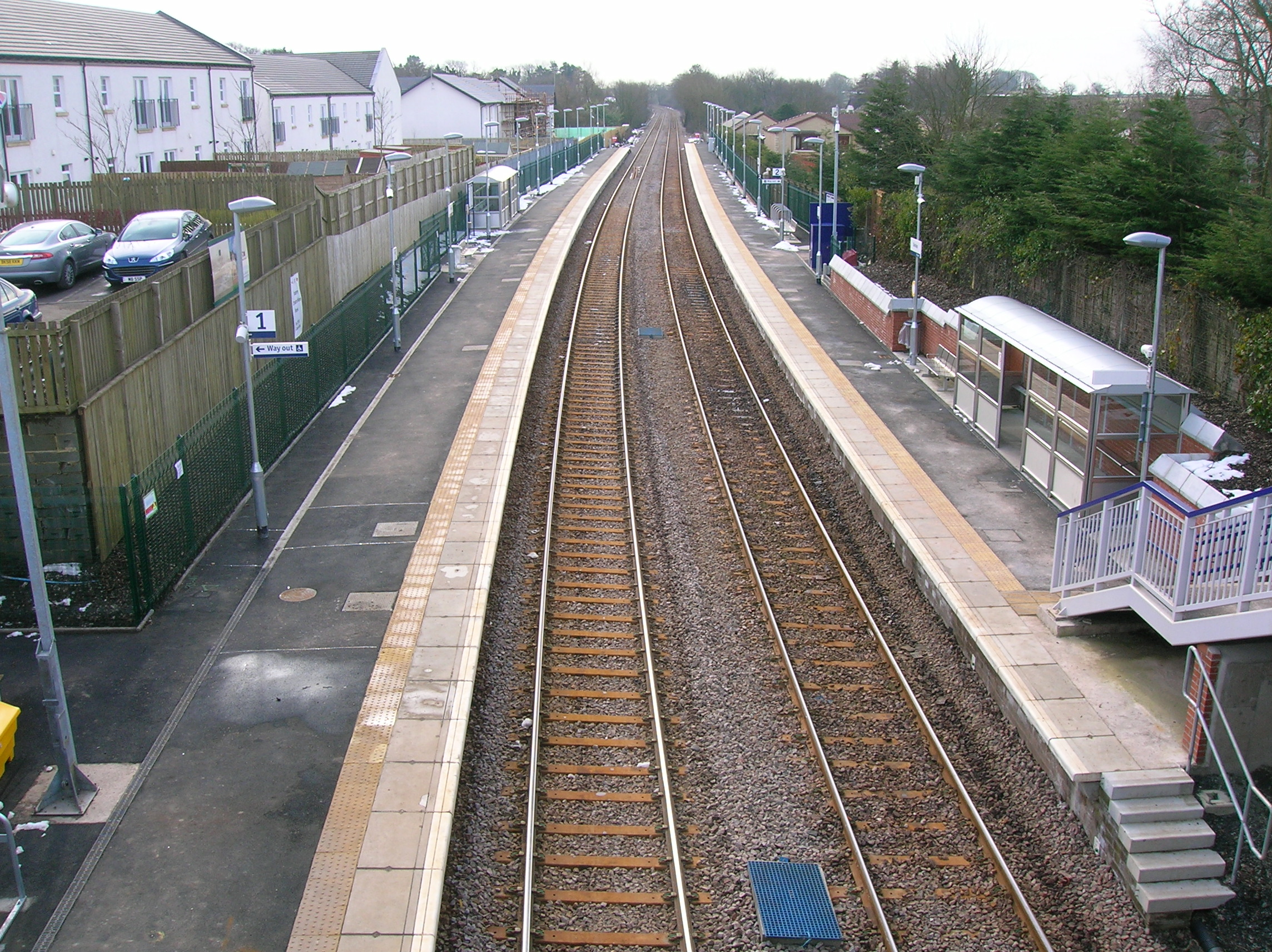
The fully reconstructed station in 2010

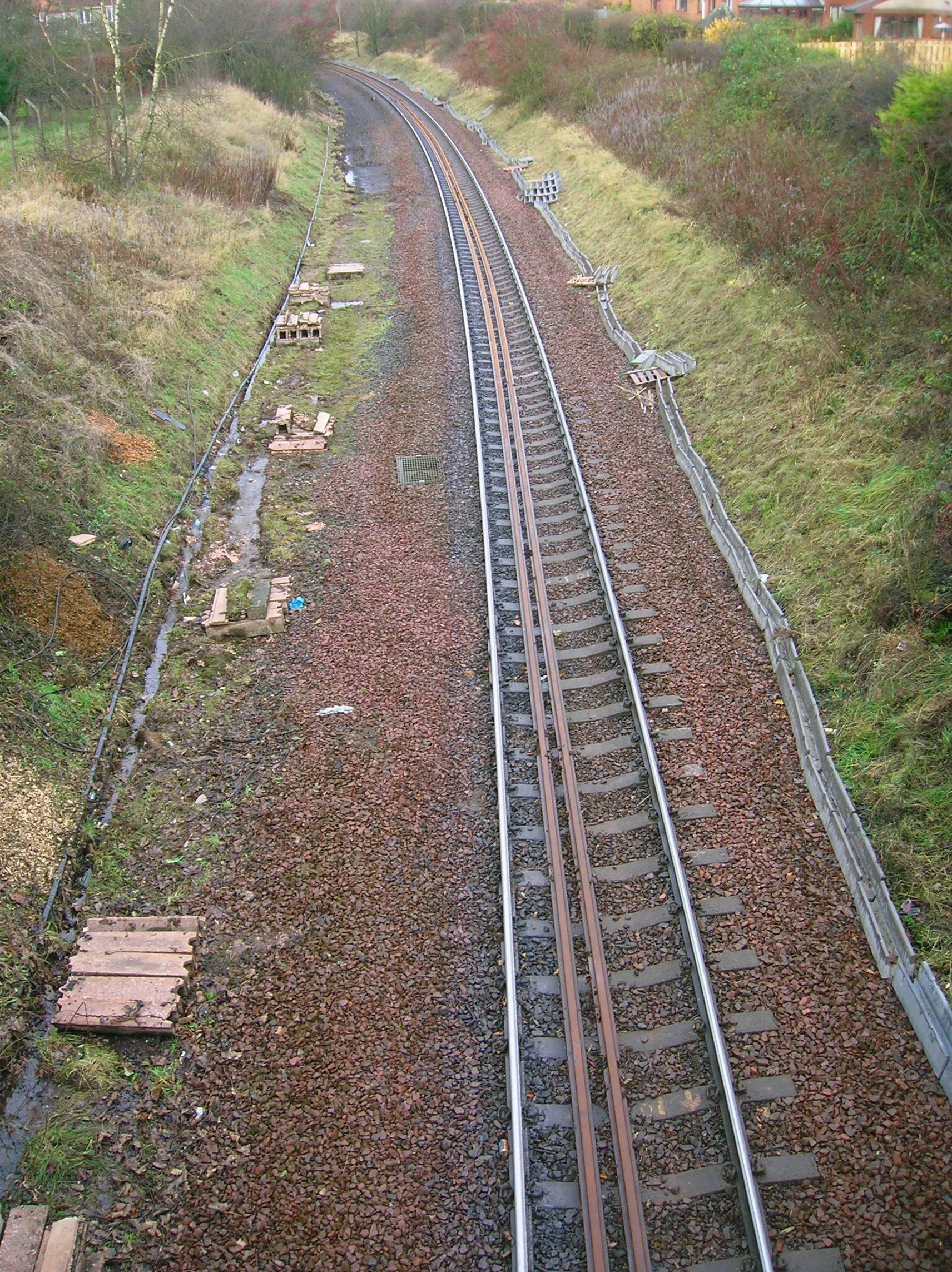
Looking towards Lugton from the overbridge. Preparatory work for the track doubling is in evidence.

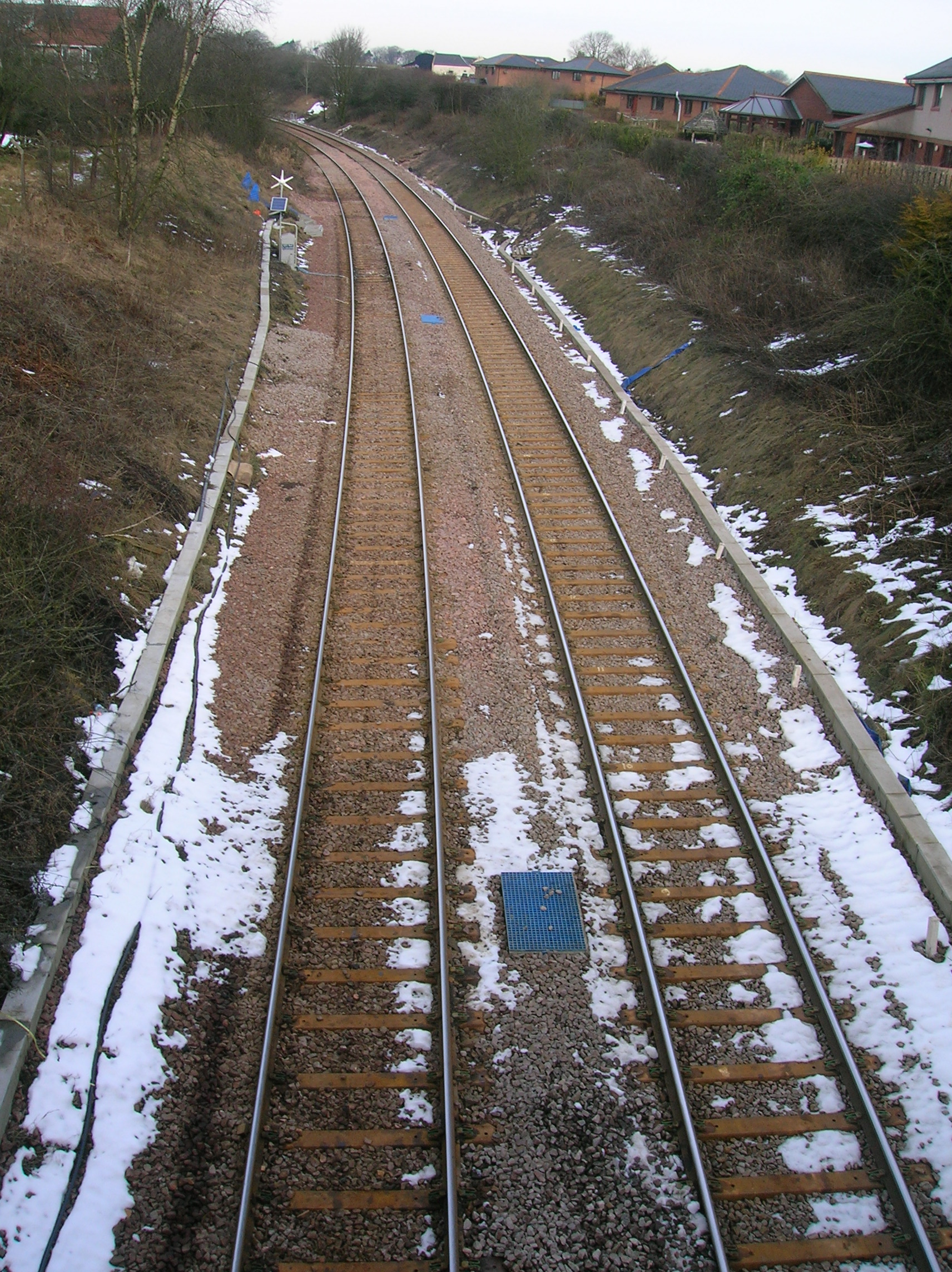
Looking towards Lugton in 2010
