= Stewarton railway station =

Railway station in East Ayrshire, Scotland

Stewarton Scottish Gaelic: Baile nan Stiùbhartach
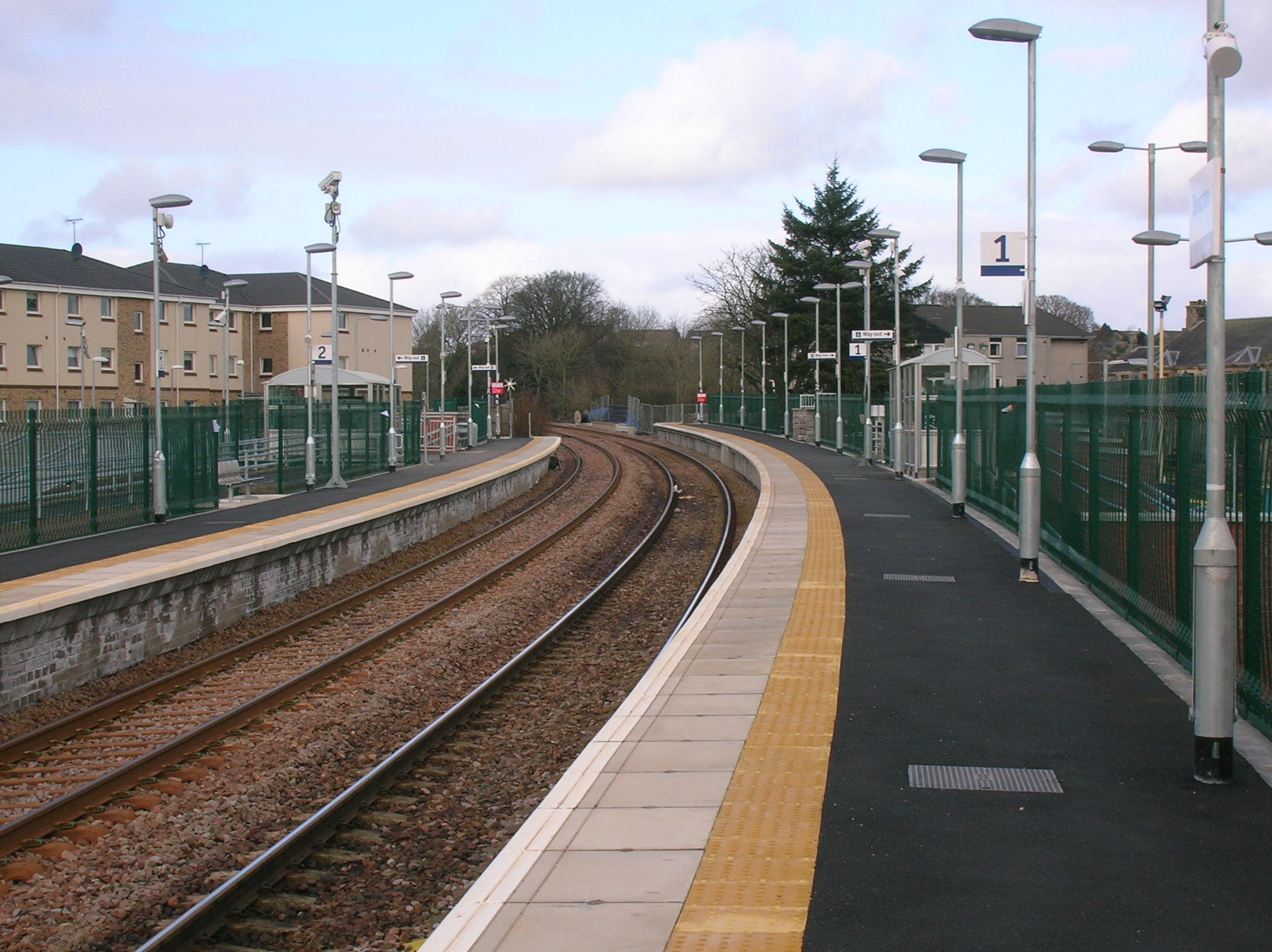
- The rebuilt Stewarton station in 2010, looking towards Glasgow

General information
- Location: Stewarton, East Ayrshire; Scotland
- Coordinates: 55.6821°N 4.5181°W
- Grid reference: NS417460
- Managed by: ScotRail
- Transit authority: SPT
- Platforms: 2

Other information
- Station code: STT

Key dates
- 27 March 1871: Opened
- 7 November 1966: Closed
- 5 June 1967: Re-opened
- 1975: Line singled and one platform taken out of service
- 2009: Line doubled and Platform 2 reinstated

Passengers
- 2020/21: ▼34,904
- 2021/22: ▲0.140 million
- 2022/23: ▲0.183 million
- 2023/24: ▲0.210 million
- 2024/25: ▲0.248 million
Location
Notes
- Passenger statistics from the Office of Rail and Road

Stewarton railway station is a railway station in the town of Stewarton, East Ayrshire, Scotland. The station is managed by ScotRail and is on the Glasgow South Western Line.

== History ==
The station was opened on 27 March 1871 by the Glasgow, Barrhead and Kilmarnock Joint Railway. The station closed on 7 November 1966, however it reopened on 5 June 1967. In April 2007 a 'Ticket Issuing Machine' was installed in recognition of the relatively high passenger levels.

Operations to reinstate a second line between Lochridge Junction near Stewarton and Lugton started in 2008. During the upgrade work (on 27 January 2009), a bridge crossing the A735 road south of the station collapsed as an oil train was passing over it, resulting in several tank wagons in the consist derailing and catching fire. No-one was hurt in the accident; the line was closed between Barrhead and Kilmarnock for three weeks whilst the tankers were recovered and the damaged bridge rebuilt (the structure had already been scheduled for replacement as part of the re-doubling project prior to the accident).

When the work was completed in September 2009, the second platform was reinstated, the pedestrian underpass re-opened and full disabled access provided. An overspill car park opened on 31 January 2012, accessed from platform 2.

Stewarton opened for goods traffic on 23 March 1871 and closed on 5 October 1964. It handled general goods as well as livestock and horseboxes.

The station lay 19.02 miles (30.61 km) south of the old terminus, Glasgow Saint Enoch.

The station has been adopted (2015) by the staff and clients of Hansel Village near Symington and they also maintain the displays of planted flowers on the platforms.

== Services ==
=== 2008/2009 ===
The station had a basic hourly service each way (including Sundays) to Glasgow and Kilmarnock, with some southbound trains continuing to either Carlisle or Girvan and Stranraer.

=== From December 2009 ===
Since 13 December 2009, the station has had a basic half-hourly service each way to Glasgow and Kilmarnock. One northbound train each hour stops only at Barrhead, the other calls at all stations to Glasgow.

The Sunday service is hourly and now serves local stations beyond Barrhead northbound (except Crossmyloof). This timetable remains in operation in December 2025.

Some southbound trains continue to either Carlisle (every two hours), or Ayr, Girvan and Stranraer (limited service).

A ticket machine is located on Platform 2.

From December 2012, all trains on a Sunday use Platform 1 only, as does the 5.31 am Glasgow-bound weekday train.

=== 2016 floods ===
In January 2016 a number of Virgin Trains were re-routed via Kilmarnock due to flood damage to a bridge on the Glasgow to Carlisle main line near Lockerbie. The full regular half-hourly service was suspended for a time and replaced with an hourly during off peak times.

== Gallery ==
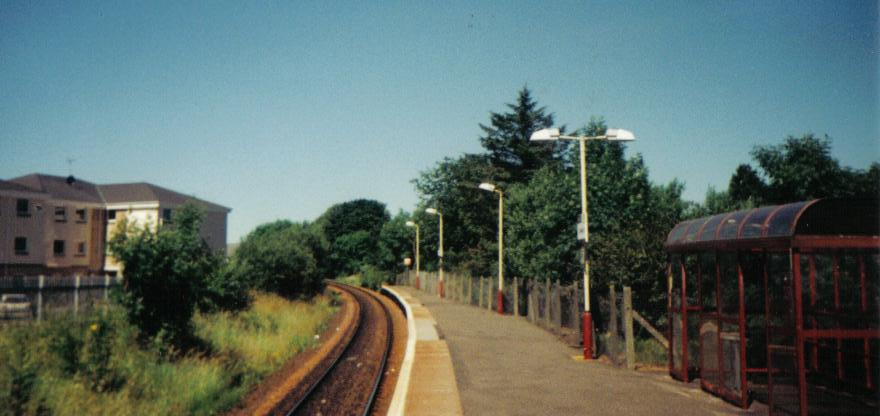
Stewarton station as it was in July 2005, looking towards Glasgow

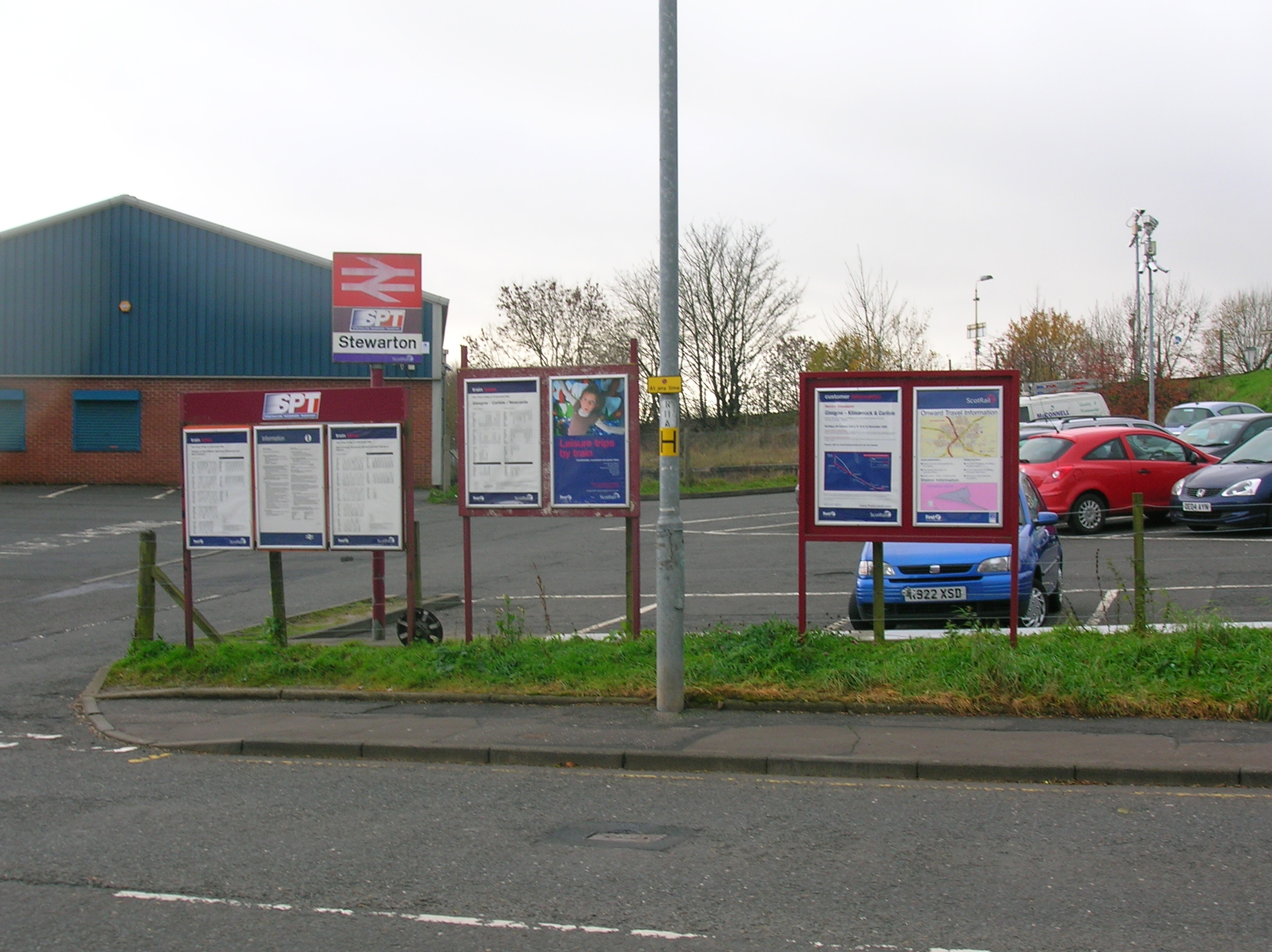
The entrance to Stewarton railway station

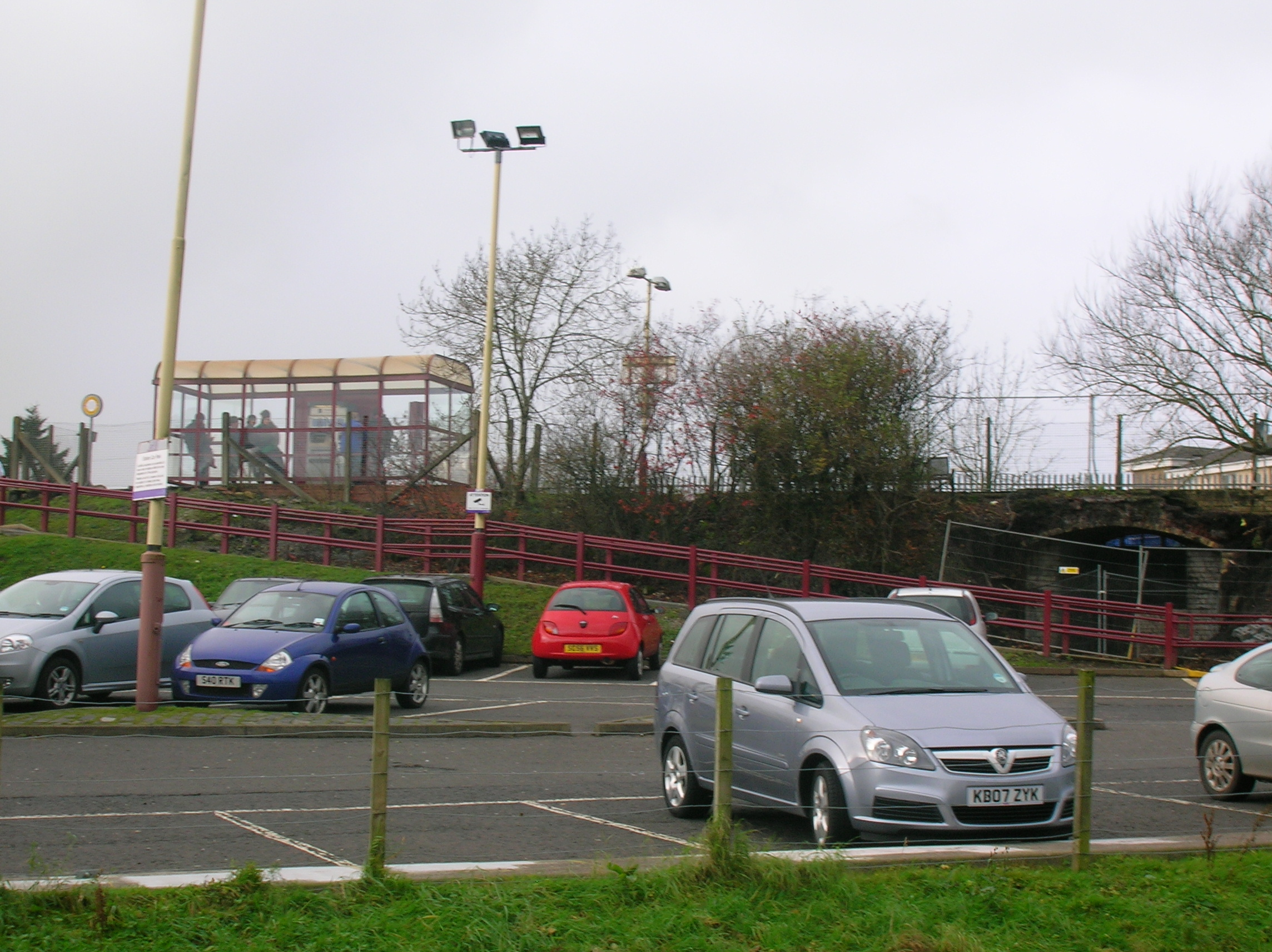
Stewarton station infrastructure with the old underpass visible

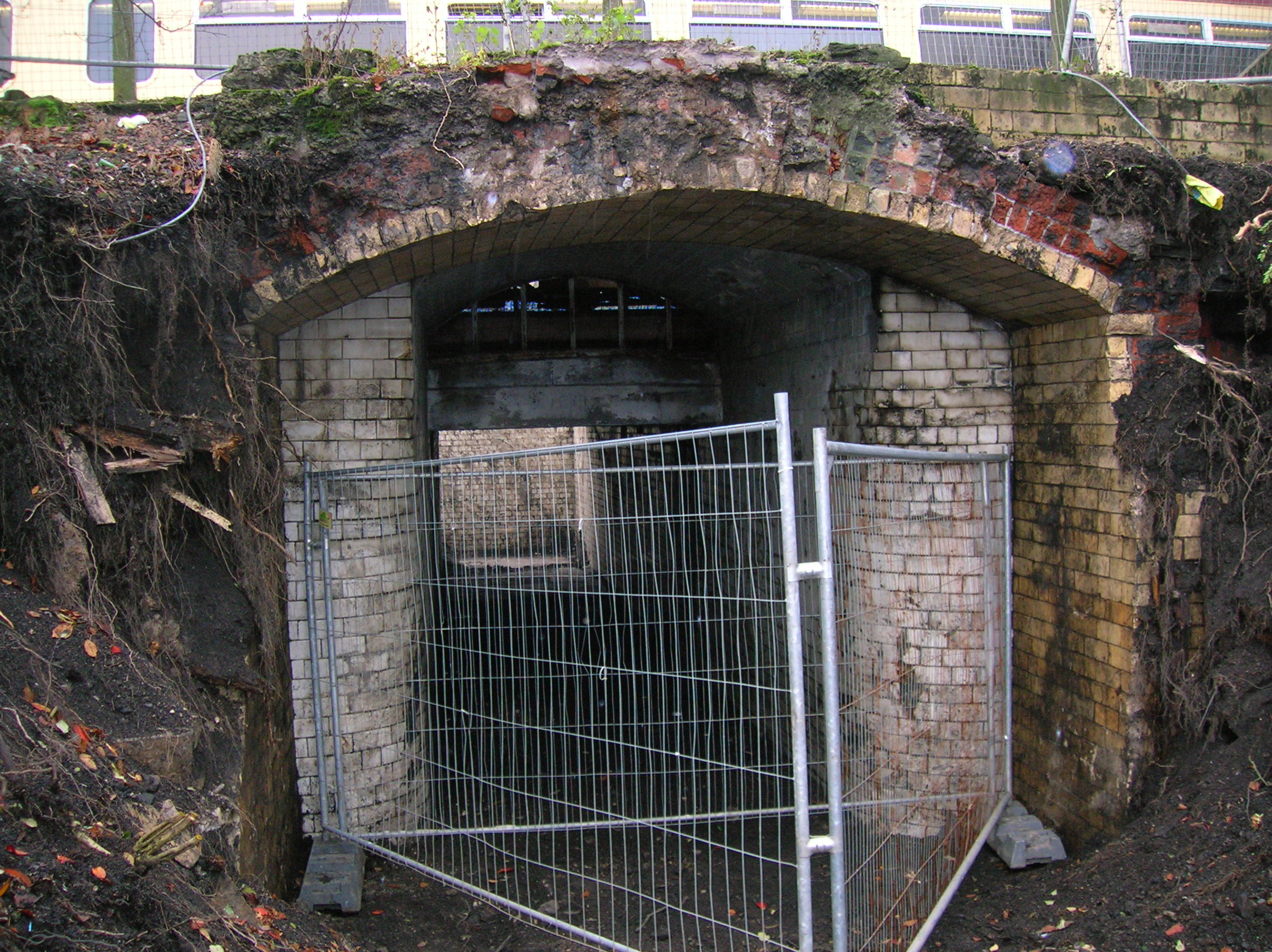
The old pedestrian underpass as excavated during platform building works in 2009

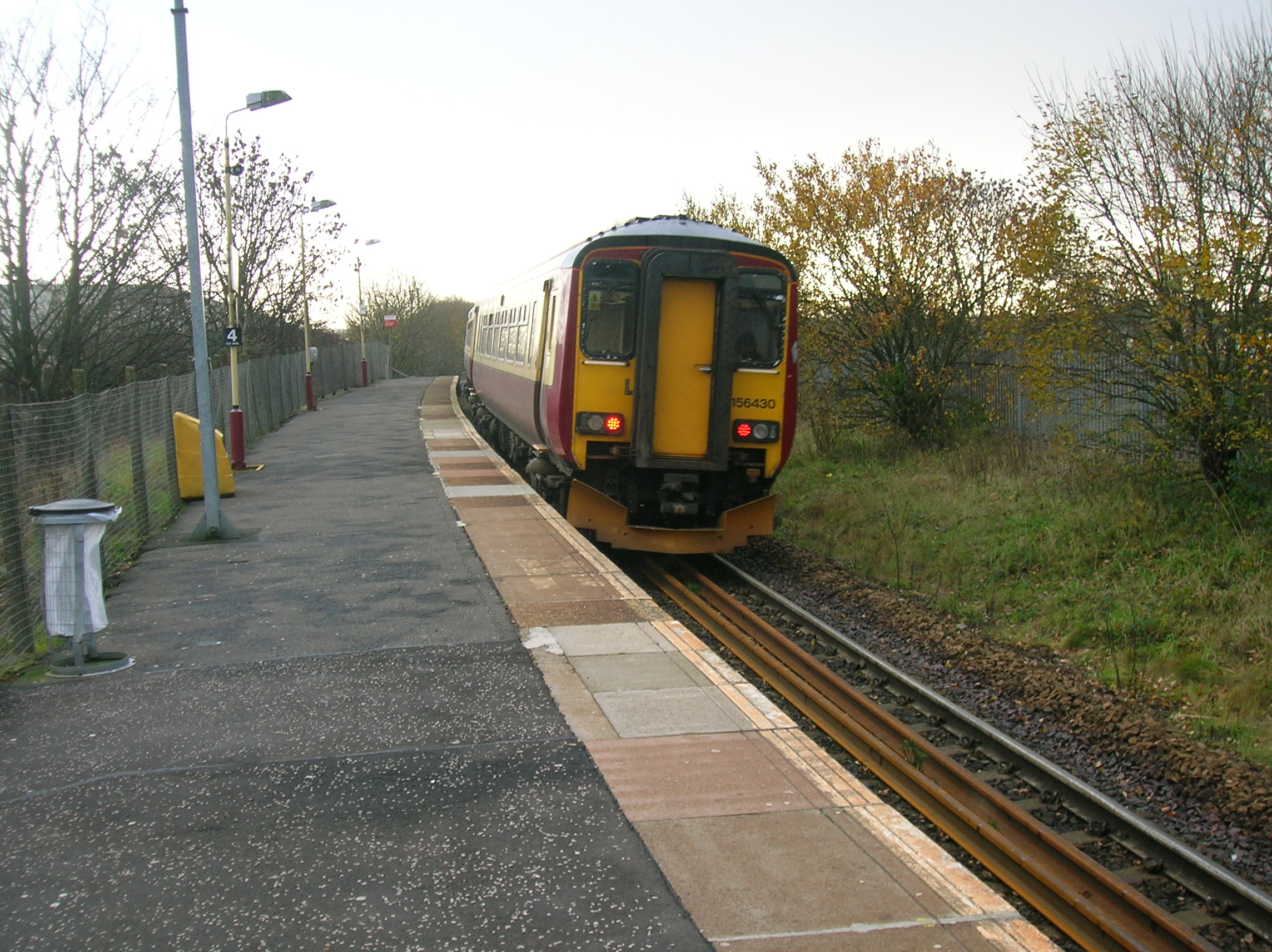
Stewarton station in 2008 with a train heading to Kilmarnock

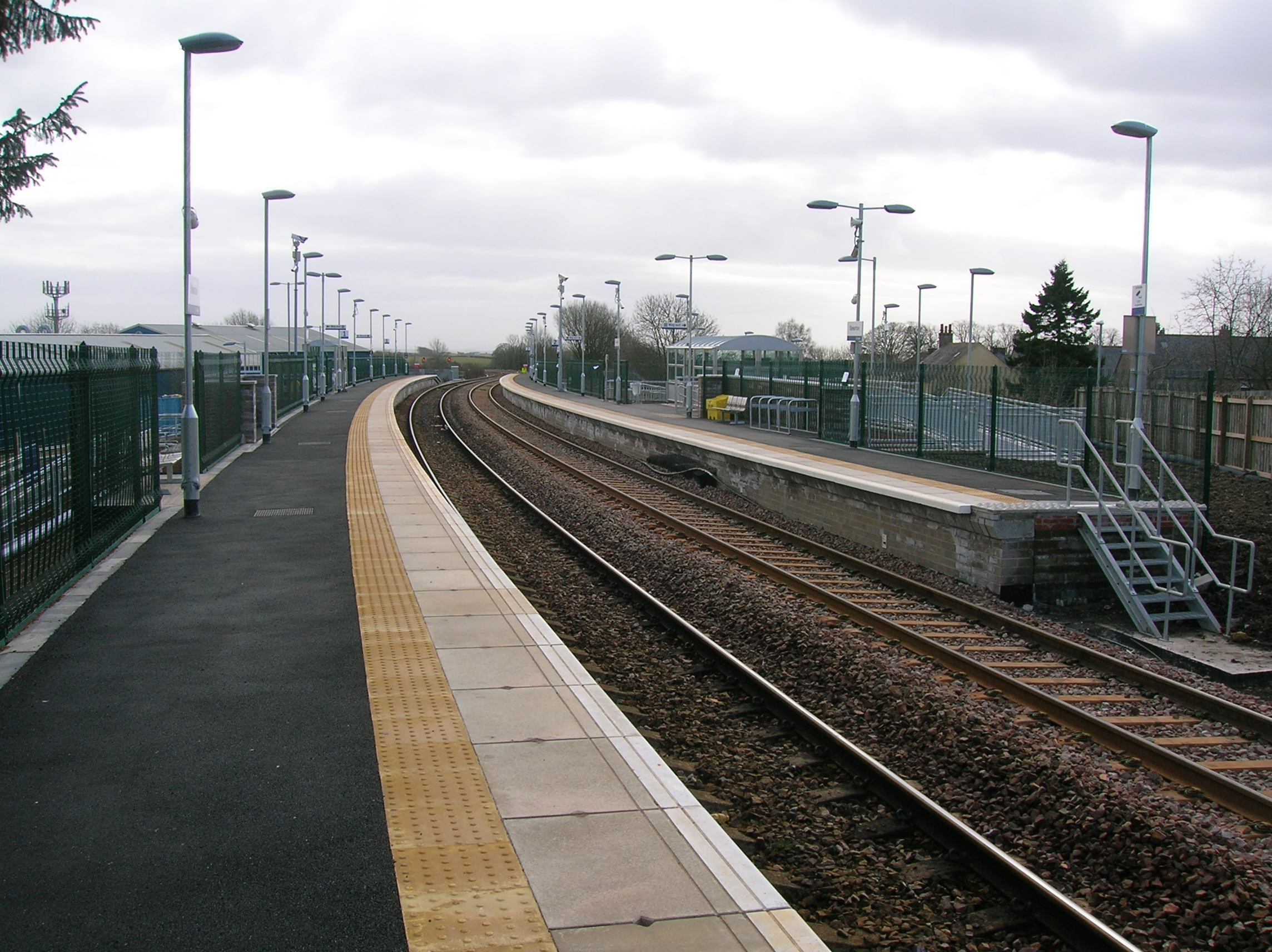
Looking towards Kilmarnock in 2010

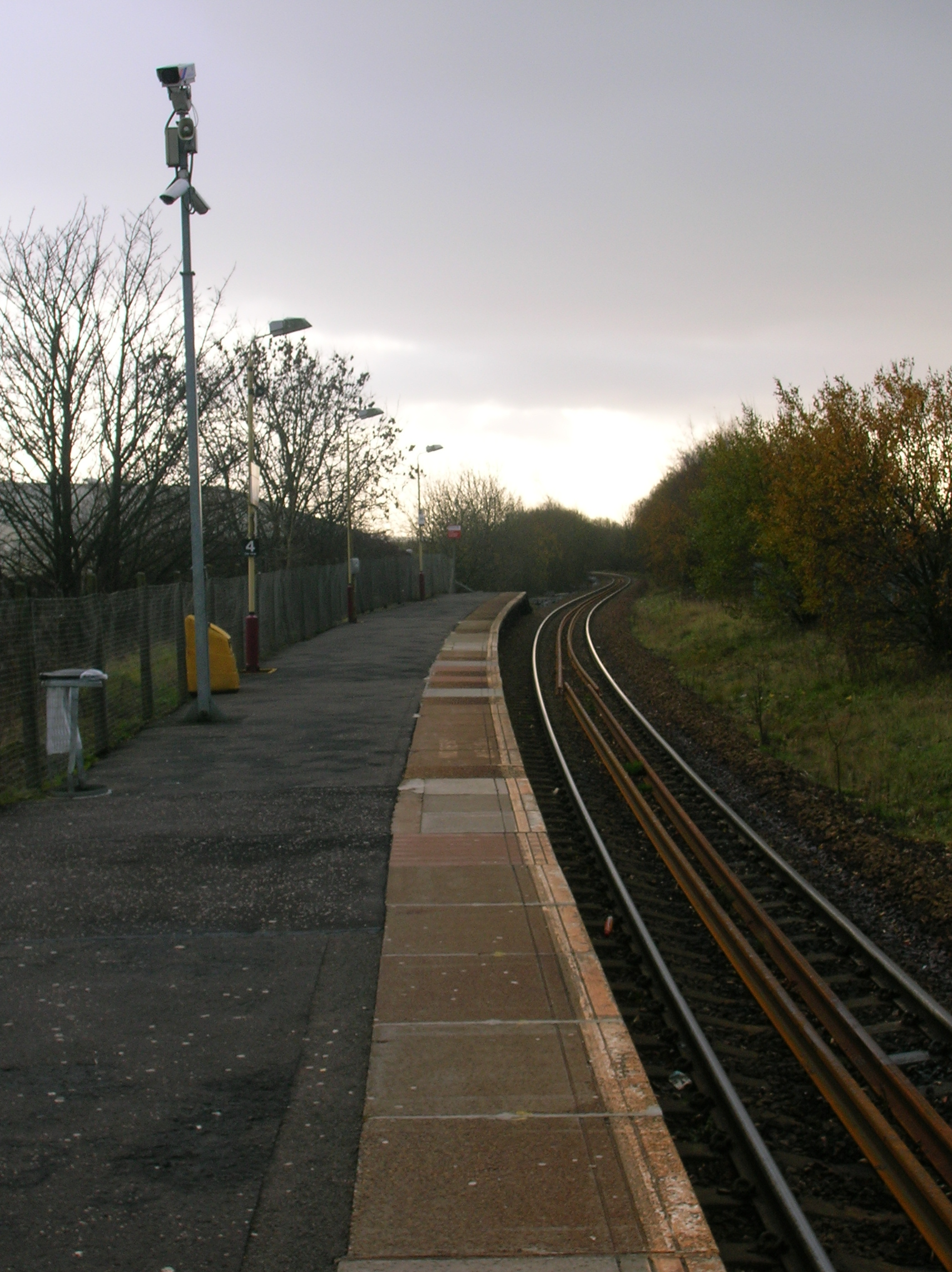
Stewarton station facing towards Kilmarnock with track doubling work in evidence

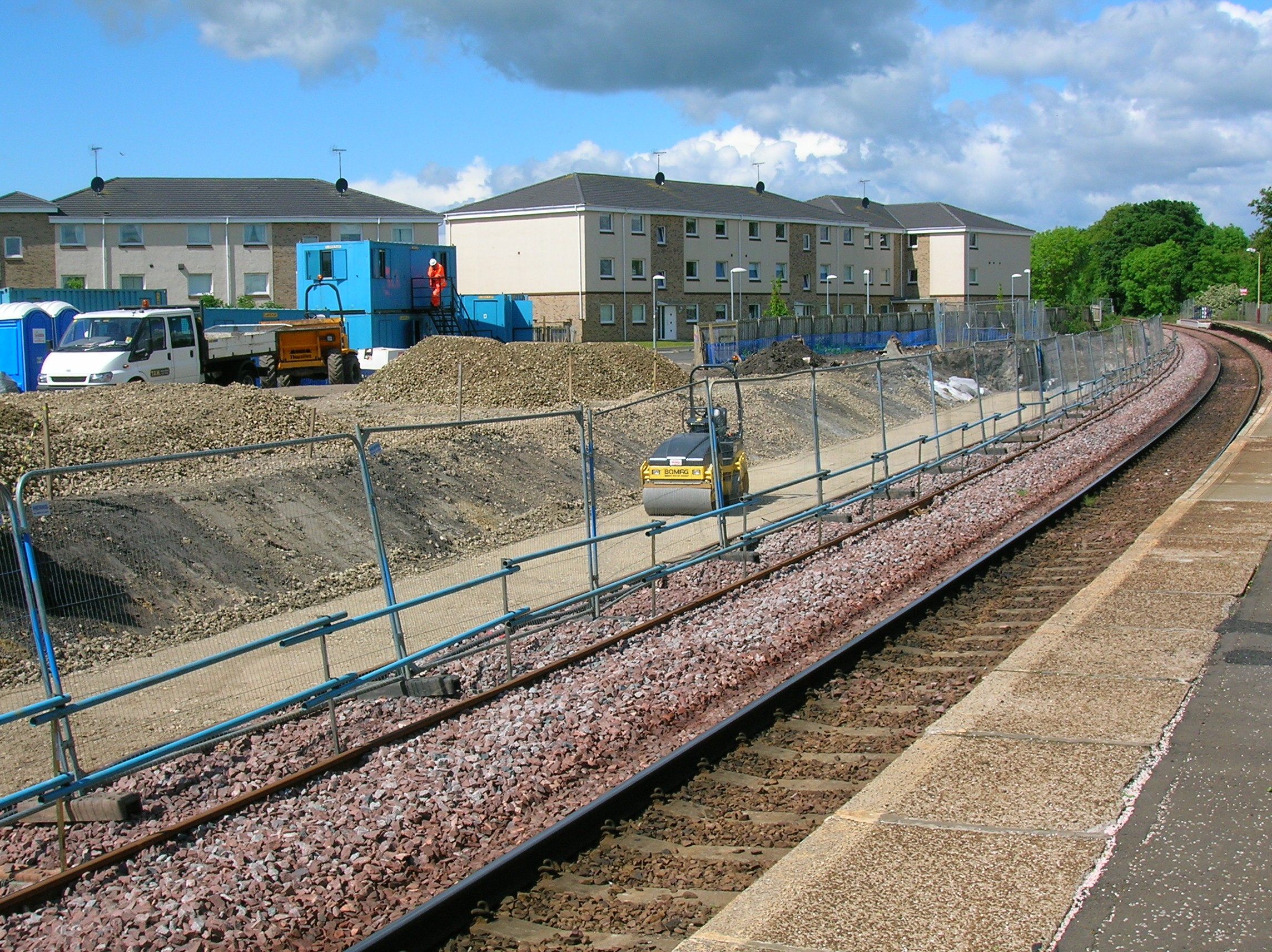
Platform construction works under way in 2009

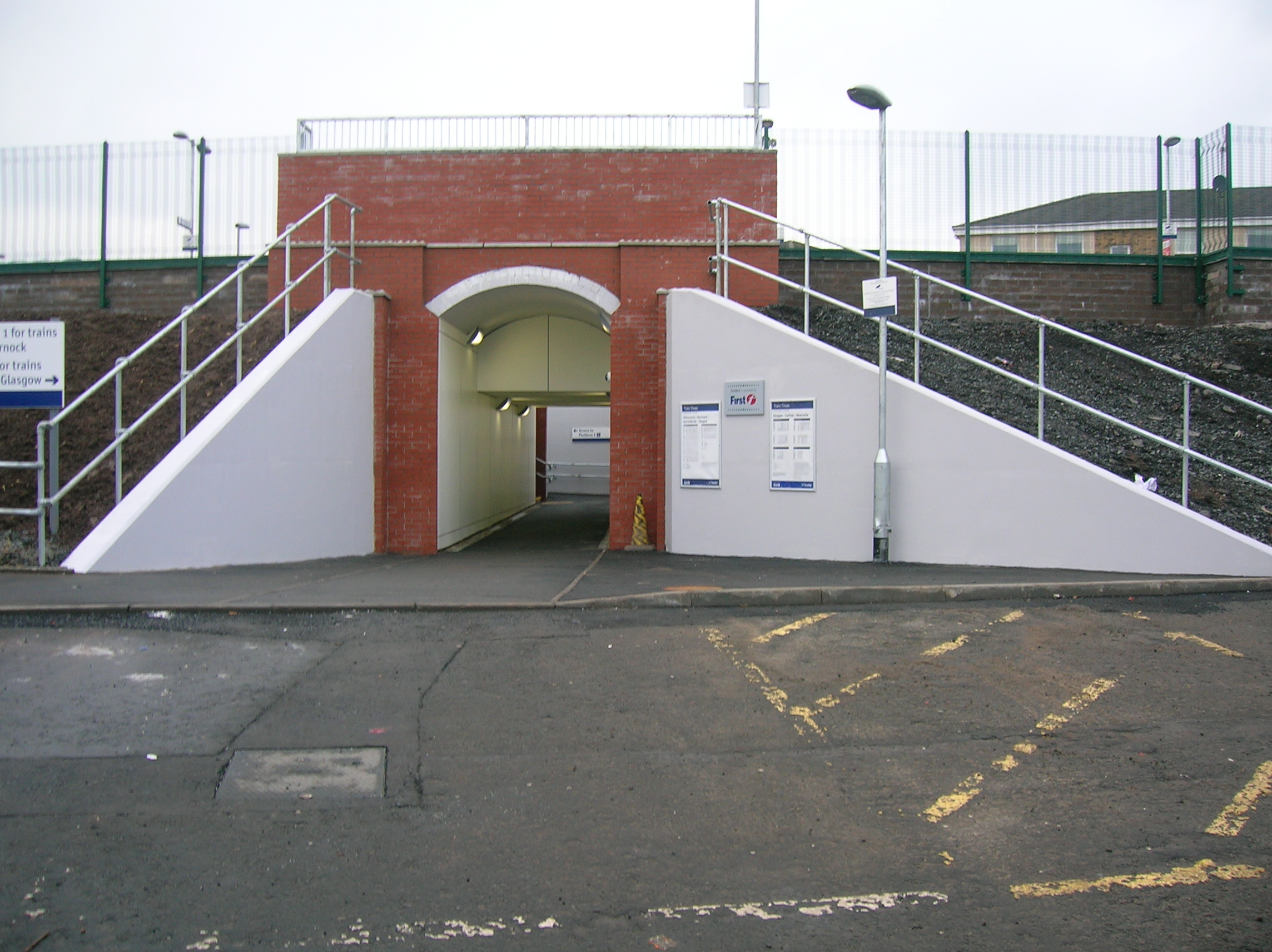
New underpass to Platform 2 in 2010

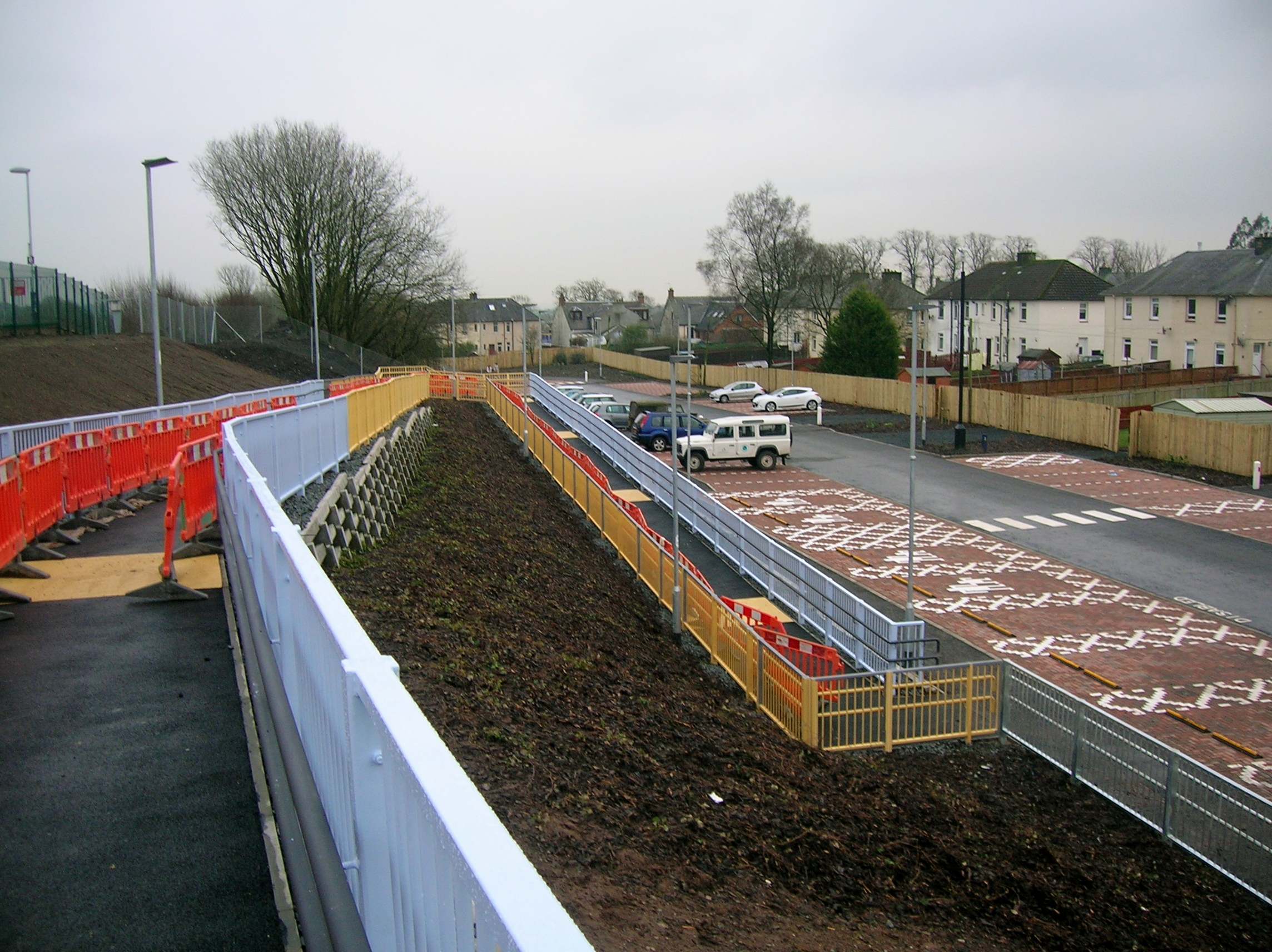
The new car park that opened on 31 January 2012

Preceding station	National Rail	Following station
Kilmaurs	ScotRail; Glasgow South Western Line	Dunlop
	Historical railways	
Kilmaurs	Caledonian and Glasgow & South Western Railways; Glasgow, Barrhead and Kilmarnock Joint Railway	Dunlop
