= 2021 Kilmarnock incidents =

Related Stabbings in Kilmarnock, Scotland in February 2021

- Police Scotland attending the scene at Kilmarnock railway viaduct in Portland Street, shortly after the second incident occurred

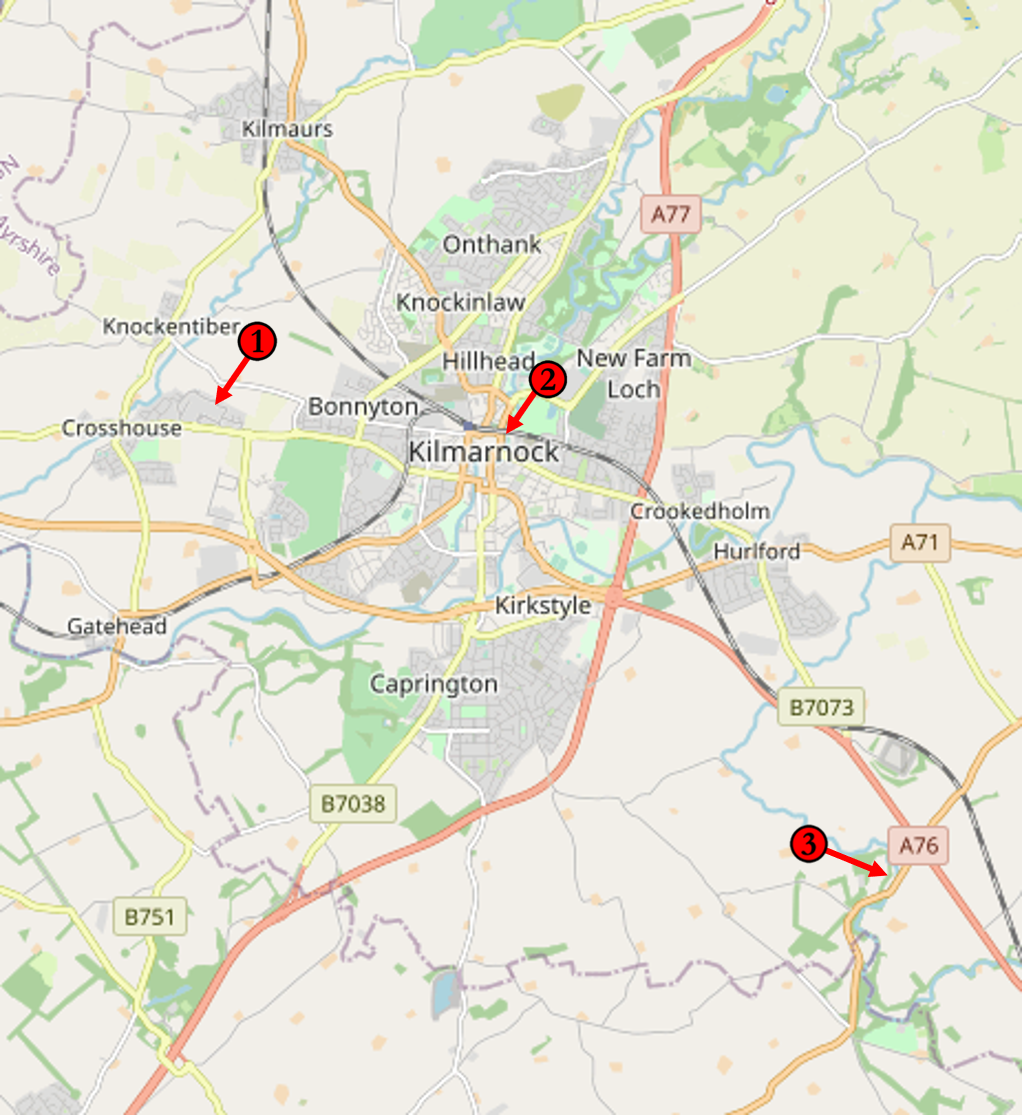
- (1) University Hospital Crosshouse where the first incident took place. (2) The Kilmarnock railway viaduct where the stabbing took place. (3) Vehicle crash near the A76 road which was linked to the earlier incidents.
- Location: 55.61106°N 4.49571°W; Kilmarnock, Scotland: University Hospital Crosshouse; Kilmarnock railway viaduct A76 road
- Date: 4 February 2021; 7:45pm–11:00pm (GMT)
- Deaths: 3 (including the perpetrator)
- Victims: Nicole Anderson; Emma Robertson Coupland
- Perpetrator: Steven Robertson

On 4 February 2021, three separate fatal incidents occurred in Kilmarnock, Scotland. The incidents were thought to be linked and involved the same 40-year-old man, Steven Robertson. In the first incident, a woman died after being injured outside University Hospital Crosshouse. In the second incident, a woman died after being stabbed in the town. In the third incident, the man was killed in a road crash just off the A76.

Armed Police Scotland officers responded to the scene at University Hospital Crosshouse before putting the site under a police lockdown. Police Scotland's Ayrshire division had ruled out any connection to the attacks being related to terrorism.

On 5 February 2021, the police confirmed that a woman who had been injured outside University Hospital Crosshouse had died as a result of her injuries, whilst her daughter, a 24-year-old woman, who was stabbed at Portland Street also died as a result of her injuries. The man also later died from his injuries as a result of crashing his car on a road off the A76.

The perpetrator, Steven Robertson, was later identified, and it was reported that he killed his ex-wife Emma Coupland, and step-daughter, Nicole Anderson.

== Timeline of events ==
=== University Hospital Crosshouse ===
At about 7:45 pm on the evening of 4 February 2021, a 39-year-old woman was found injured at the University Hospital Crosshouse car park, and was later declared dead at the scene. The hospital was placed under a police lockdown after the incident and all ambulance and hospital traffic was diverted to University Hospital Ayr as a result.

Shortly after 11:00pm on 4 February 2021, NHS Ayrshire and Arran confirmed that the lockdown at the hospital had been lifted and it was safe for staff and patients to come, though a large police presence would remain on the scene.

=== Town centre ===
About 20 minutes following the attack at University Hospital Crosshouse, a second incident occurred in the town centre by the railway viaduct. At 8:05 pm, a 24-year-old woman was stabbed and seriously wounded. She was taken to hospital where she later died from her wounds. Portland Street, where the viaduct is situated, was cornered off by police attending the scene, with all traffic being diverted away from the area. The public were strongly urged to stay away from the area.

=== Fatal road crash ===
At around 8:30pm, an hour following the first incident at University Hospital Crosshouse, police responded to a "serious road collision" just off the A76 road, south of Kilmarnock. A 40-year-old man, alleged to have been involved in the earlier incidents died in the crash. After the crash, police confirmed they were not looking for anyone else as part of the investigation and there was no ongoing threat to the public.

The joint funeral for Emma Robertson Coupland and her daughter Nicole Anderson was held on 24 February.

== Response ==
A statement issued from Police Scotland noted that "Officers in Kilmarnock are currently dealing with two serious incidents in the town at this time, one at Crosshouse Hospital and a second in Portland Street. These areas are cordoned off and the public are asked to avoid them at this time." Police Scotland confirmed that "officers are not looking for anyone else as part of their investigation and there is no ongoing threat to the public". Chief Superintendent of Police Scotland, Faroque Hussain, issued a statement shortly after the incidents occurred, stating that “a number of locations remain cordoned off as officers continue to conduct enquiries. We are working to confirm the full circumstances of what has happened. If anyone has any information which could assist our enquiries, please do contact us. Understandably, people will be shocked by what has happened. We are still in the process of establishing the full circumstances, however, I would like to reassure people that there is no wider threat to the community. Officers will be on patrol and anyone with any concerns can approach these officers".

In a statement, Crawford McGuffie, medical director at NHS Ayrshire and Arran, said: "NHS Ayrshire and Arran is aware of an incident in the grounds of University Hospital Crosshouse. As a result, the hospital has been under lockdown, and ambulances diverted to University Hospital Ayr. We are assisting Police Scotland with their investigations, and to ensure the safety of staff, patients and visitors. As this is a Police Scotland incident, we are unable to comment any further at this time."

NHS Ayrshire and Arran issued assurance that the risk to the public was deemed to be "minimal", leading to the lockdown being lifted at University Hospital Crosshouse several hours later. In an additional statement, Crawford McGuffie said "We would like to reassure anyone coming to the hospital, in particular to any patients or staff coming on shift, that Police Scotland have confirmed it is safe to do so. However, if you are worried, please speak to the onsite Police Scotland officers."

In a statement on 5 February 2021, a Police Scotland spokesperson said "A number of locations remain cordoned off as officers continue to conduct inquiries. We are working to confirm the full circumstances of what has happened. Understandably, people will be shocked by what has happened. We are still in the process of establishing the full circumstances, however, I would like to reassure people that there is no wider threat to the community."

== Reactions ==
The First Minister of Scotland, Nicola Sturgeon responded immediately after the incident was declared and told people to follow police guidance. She sent out her condolences to those affected and shared her gratitude towards the emergency services and told the public to continue following police advice.

The Deputy First Minister of Scotland, John Swinney, sent his condolences to the family and friends of those affected at the beginning of the Scottish Government's daily coronavirus briefing. Other ministers from the Scottish Government such as Jeane Freeman, Cabinet Secretary for Health and Sport and Humza Yousaf, Cabinet Secretary for Justice also shared their thoughts with those affected and told the public to follow police guidance.

Other politicians who publicly expressed their condolences were Douglas Ross MP for Moray, leader of the Scottish Conservatives, Monica Lennon MSP for Central Scotland as well as Barry Douglas, the local councillor for the Kilmarnock East and Hurlford ward of East Ayrshire Council who tweeted "Thoughts are with everyone involved in the incidents that have taken place."

A spokesperson for East Ayrshire Council, the council area in which the attacks occurred, issued a statement on 5 February, stating "we know that our communities will be shocked and saddened by these events, but we wish to reassure you that there is no risk to the general public", adding that "as this is an ongoing police matter, we need to keep a number of roads in Kilmarnock town centre closed and diversions are in place, and on the A76, to allow the investigation to continue".

== See also ==
- 2021 in Scotland
