= Kilmarnock railway viaduct =

Railway viaduct in Scotland

Kilmarnock Railway Viaduct Drochaid-rèile Chille Mheàrnaig (Scottish Gaelic)
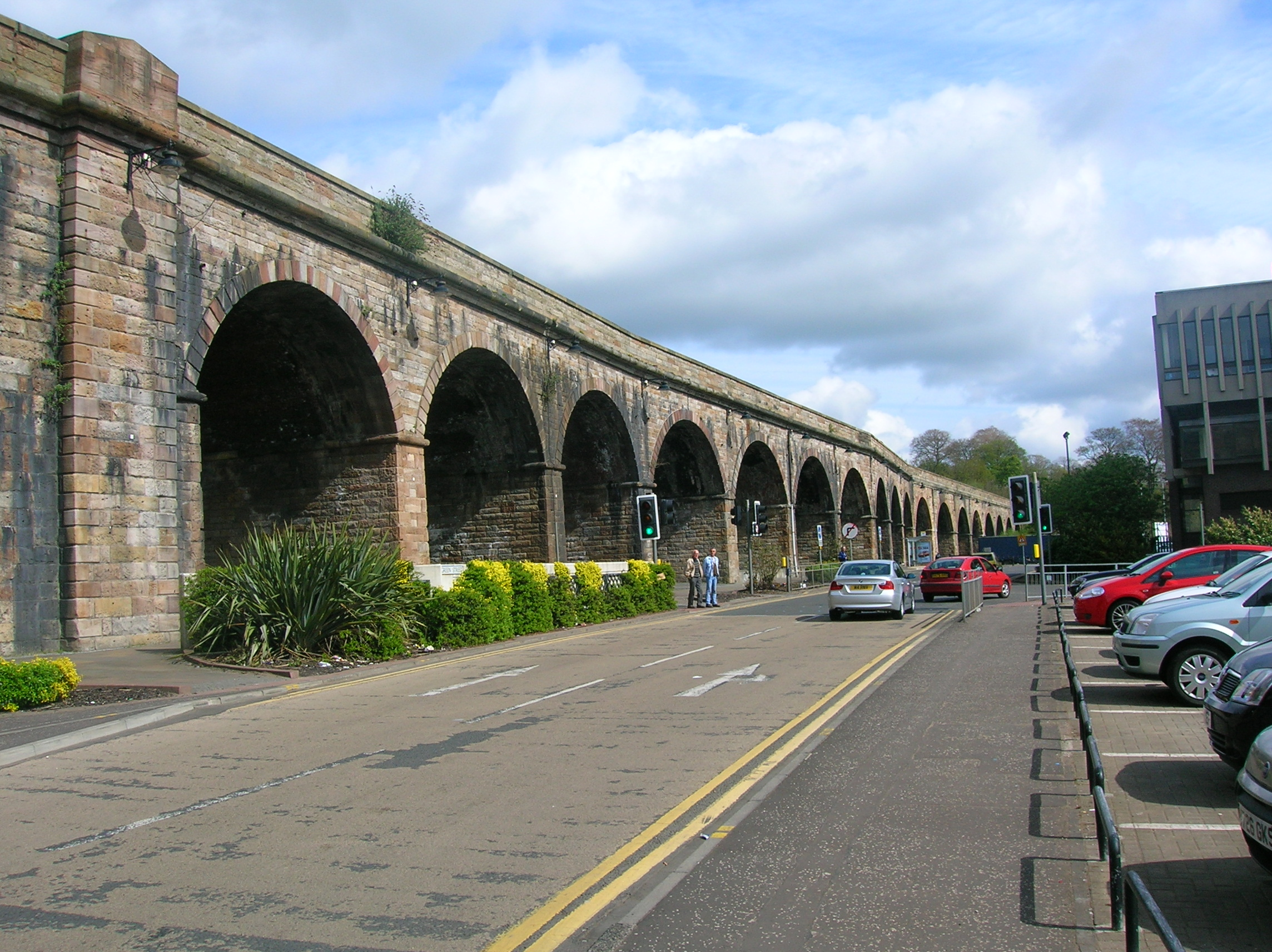
- Kilmarnock Railway Viaduct as viewed from Portland Street, 2007
- Coordinates: 55.6119°N 4.4944°W
- Carries: Glasgow South Western Line
- Crosses: Kilmarnock Water
- Locale: East Ayrshire
- Named for: Kilmarnock
- Owner: Network Rail
- Maintained by: Network Rail

Characteristics
- Design: Arch
- Material: Stone
- No. of spans: 23

History
- Designer: John Miller and Thomas Grainger
- Construction start: 1843
- Construction end: 1850

Listed Building – Category B
- Official name: Portland Street And Soulis Street, Viaduct
- Designated: 2 July 1980
- Reference no.: LB35951

Location
- Interactive map of Kilmarnock Railway Viaduct

Kilmarnock railway viaduct, known locally as The Viaduct, is a railway viaduct crossing the town centre of Kilmarnock, and was constructed between 1843 and 1850. The bridge begins at Kilmarnock railway station and leads to destinations in England. It is a most distinctive feature of the town centre with 23 masonry arches and defines the northern boundary of the town centre. It was built in the 1840s to enable the Glasgow–Kilmarnock line to continue to Carlisle.

The structure is a Category B listed building.

== History ==
The 23 arch railway viaduct was designed by John Miller and Thomas Grainger for the Glasgow, Paisley, Kilmarnock and Ayr Railway and built over the period 1843 to 1850. It enabled the railway to extend south towards Carlisle for connections to other locations in England. The viaduct begins at Kilmarnock railway station and continues over the Kilmarnock Water, leading to the south end of Kay Park.

In 2008, the viaduct had blue uplighters installed (matching the colour of the local football team Kilmarnock F.C.), and in 2019, a £213,000 upgrade with multi-coloured LEDs took place. This allowed for the circuits to be controlled above the ground and were wired in parallel, which allows individual lamps to be replaced when necessary.

== Incidents and accidents ==
In April 2012, the bridge's safety had to be upgraded after a man was seriously injured after jumping 40 ft from the top of the railway viaduct.

In February 2021, a stabbing occurred at the viaduct when a 24-year-old female was stabbed in Portland Street. The viaduct and surrounding area was cornered off by Police Scotland officers with forensic detectives carrying out investigations of the scene, with the area remaining closed to the public into the following day.

== See also ==
- List of bridges in Scotland
