= Kilmaurs railway station =

Railway station in East Ayrshire, Scotland

Kilmaurs Scottish Gaelic: Cill Mhàrais
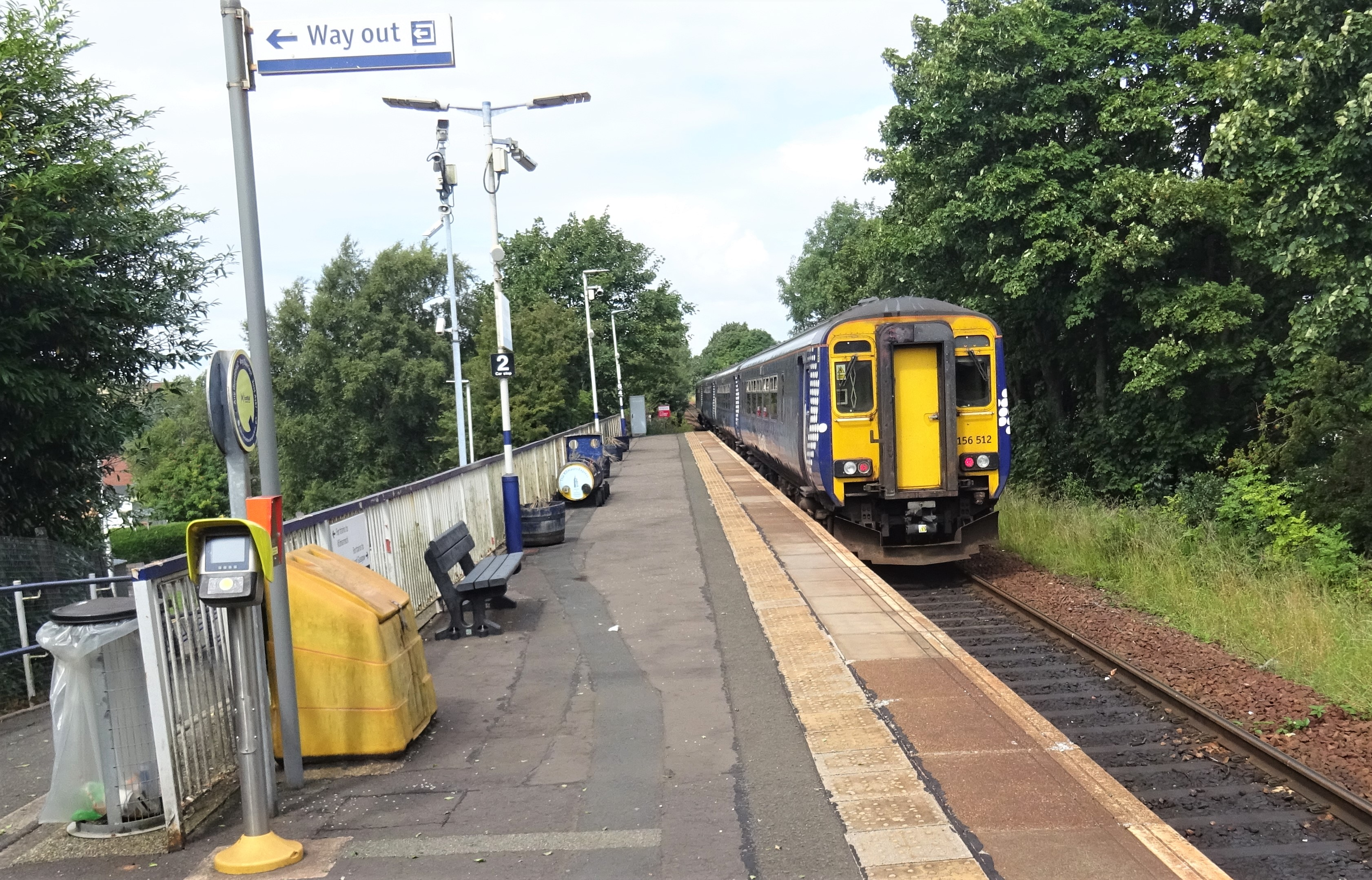
- Looking north towards Stewarton

General information
- Location: Kilmaurs, East Ayrshire; Scotland
- Coordinates: 55.6368°N 4.5306°W
- Grid reference: NS408410
- Managed by: ScotRail
- Transit authority: SPT
- Platforms: 1

Other information
- Station code: KLM
- Fare zone: K2

History
- Original company: Glasgow, Barrhead and Kilmarnock Joint Railway
- Pre-grouping: CR and G&SWR
- Post-grouping: LMS

Key dates
- 26 June 1873: Opened
- 7 November 1966: Closed
- 12 May 1984: Re-opened by British Rail
- 2009: Platform extended

Passengers
- 2020/21: ▼10,072
- 2021/22: ▲46,196
- 2022/23: ▲58,302
- 2023/24: ▲69,916
- 2024/25: ▲82,350
Location
Notes
- Passenger statistics from the Office of Rail and Road

Kilmaurs railway station is a railway station in the town of Kilmaurs, East Ayrshire, Scotland. The station is managed by ScotRail and is on the Glasgow South Western Line.

== History ==
The original Kilmaurs station was opened on 26 June 1873 by the Glasgow, Barrhead and Kilmarnock Joint Railway. The buildings on the Up platform (the platform for trains to Kilmarnock and the South) were destroyed by fire in 1914 and replaced by a brick building which, until its closure in 1966, was the only one in south west Scotland to be centrally heated. To the south of the station, a signal box containing 17 levers controlled the section and allowed access to a goods yard.

The station officially closed on 7 November 1966. The current station opened on 12 May 1984 by British Rail.

Platform extension work started in September 2009 to cater for longer units associated with the track doubling works between Stewarton and Lugton.

Being so close to Kilmarnock station the guards often failed to sell tickets to all passengers travelling to Kilmarnock. In 2012 a ticket machine was installed at the station.

== Service ==
=== 2019 service pattern ===
Since the doubling of the line between Lugton and Stewarton in December 2009 the service pattern has been:

- Mondays to Saturdays - a mainly half-hourly service northbound to Glasgow Central and southbound to Kilmarnock, with selected services extended beyond Kilmarnock towards either Carlisle or Girvan, Ayr and Stranraer.
- Sundays - hourly each way served by trains between Glasgow Central and Kilmarnock, with a few extended south towards Dumfries and Carlisle.

Preceding station	National Rail	Following station
Kilmarnock	ScotRail; Glasgow South Western Line	Stewarton
	Historical railways	
Kilmarnock	Caledonian and Glasgow & South Western Railways; Glasgow, Barrhead and Kilmarnock Joint Railway	Stewarton

== Gallery ==
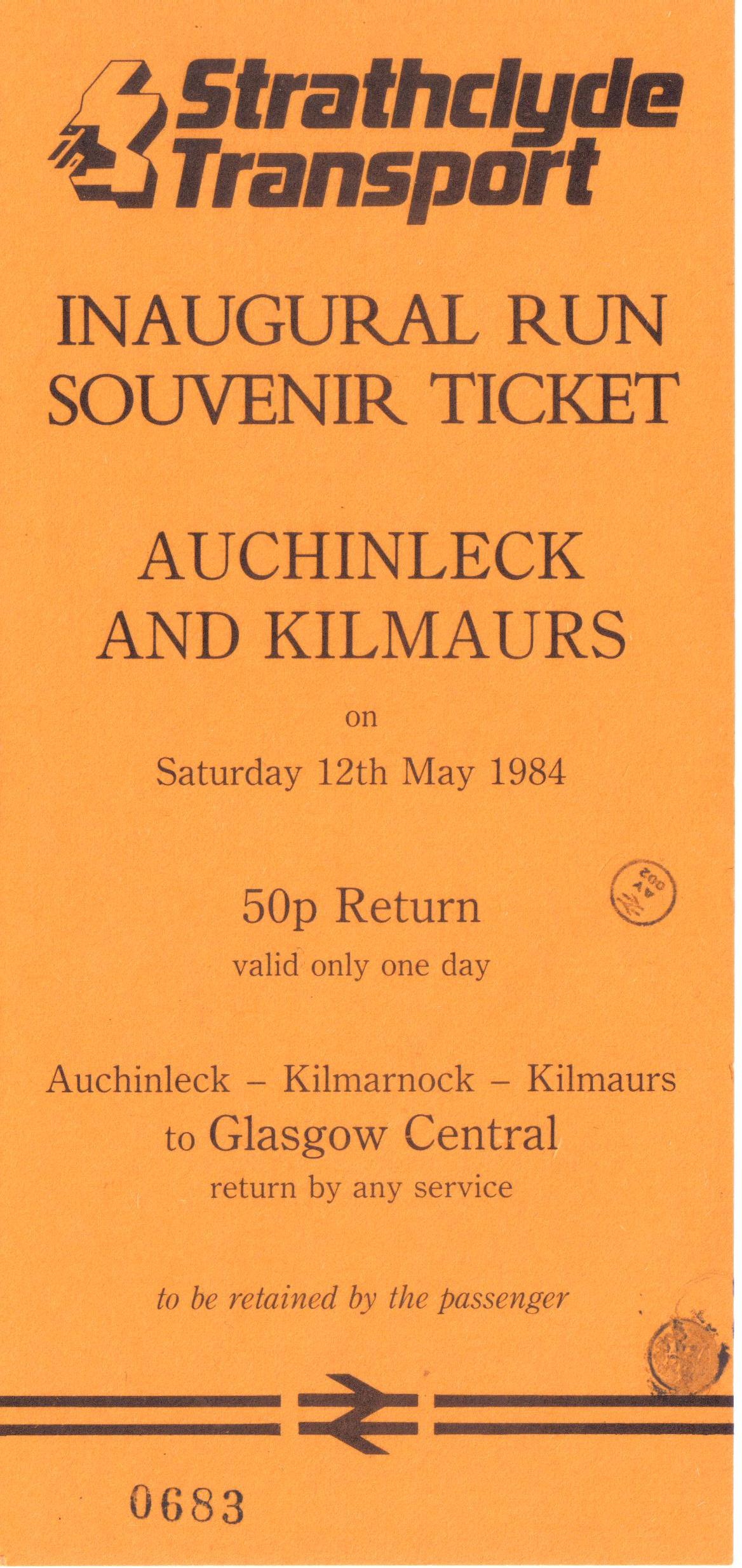
Inaugural run souvenir ticket for 12 May 1984

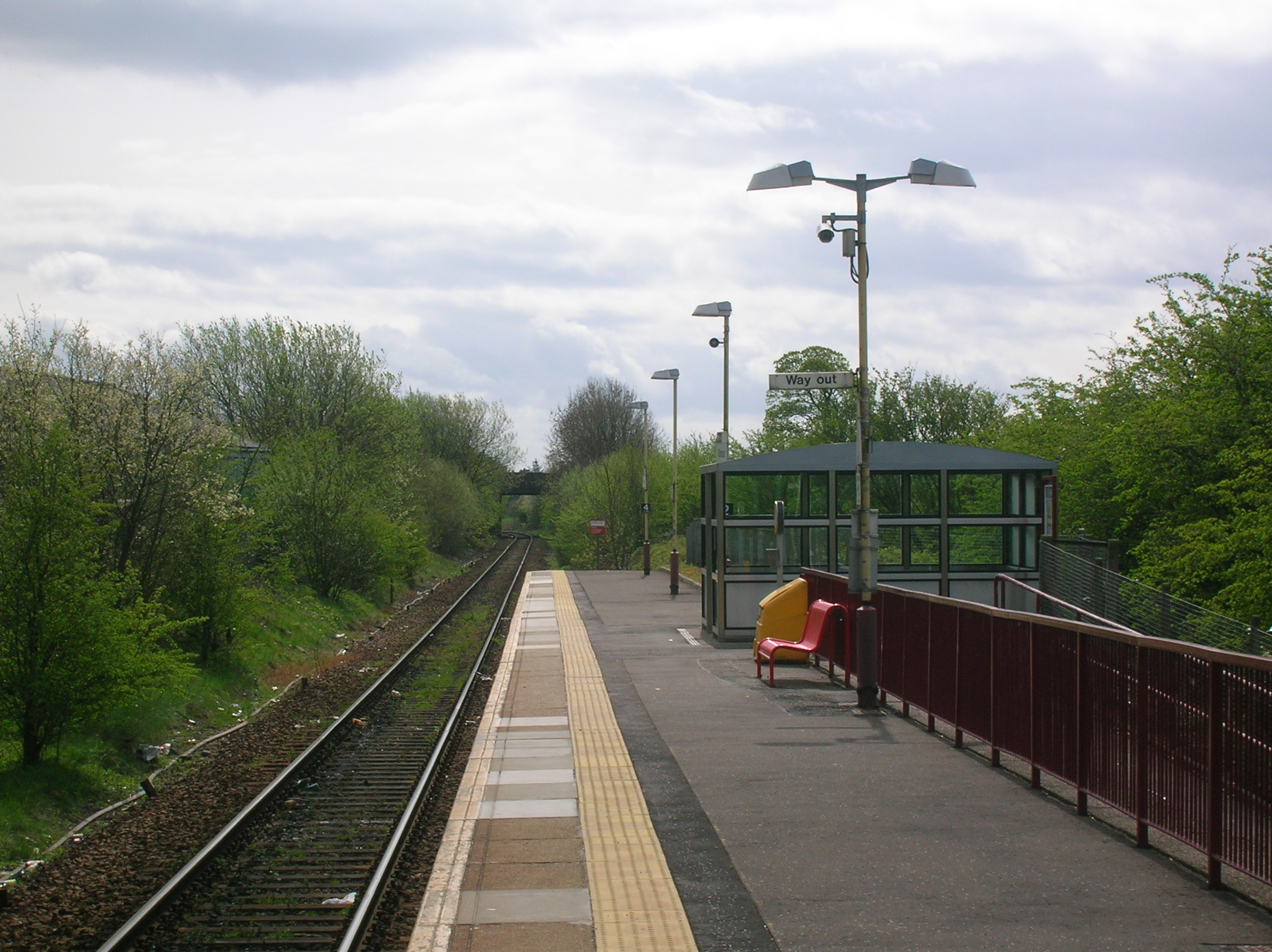
Looking towards Kilmarnock (note the new shelter), 2007

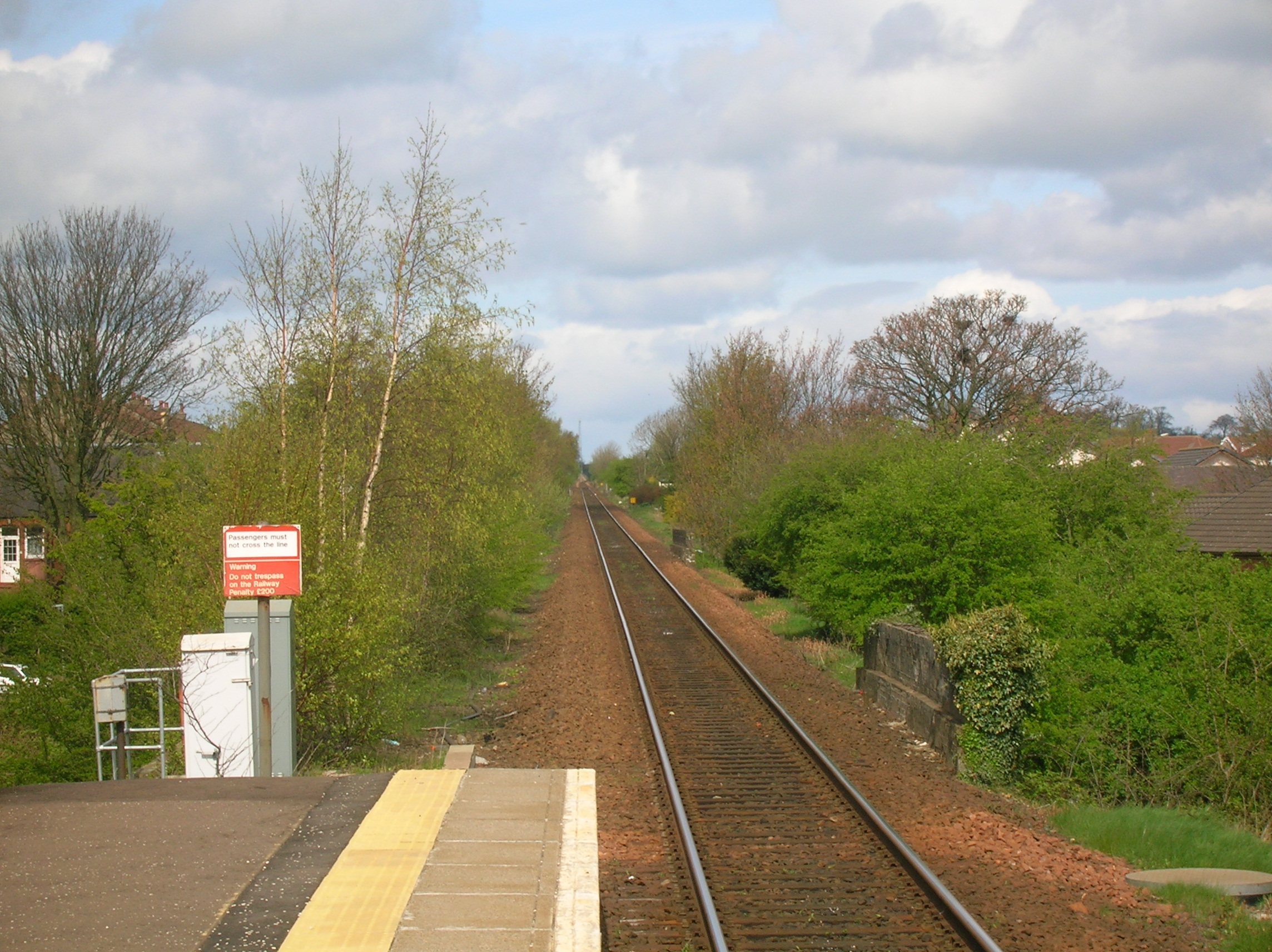
Looking towards Stewarton, 2007

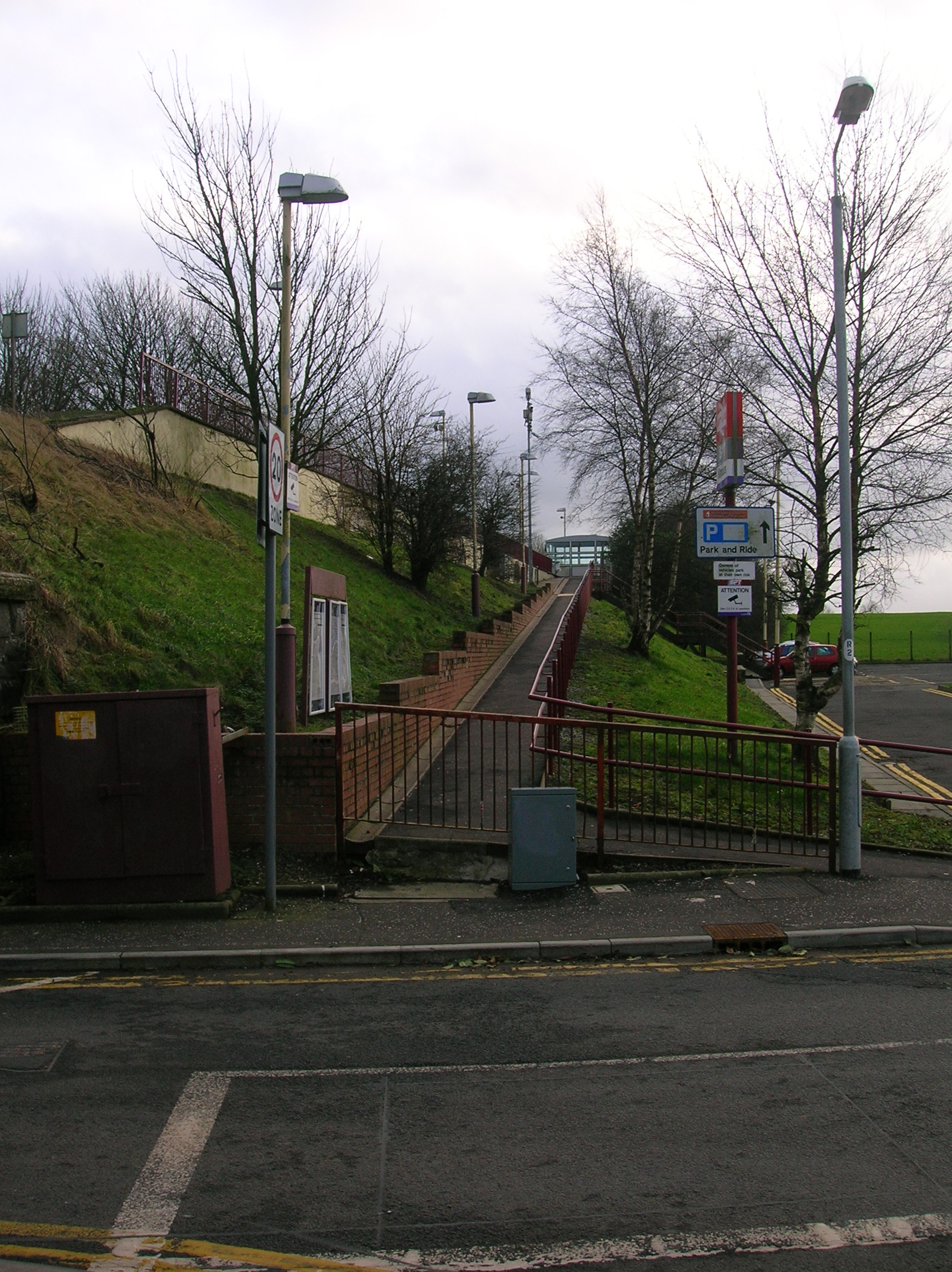
Kilmaurs station approach, 2008

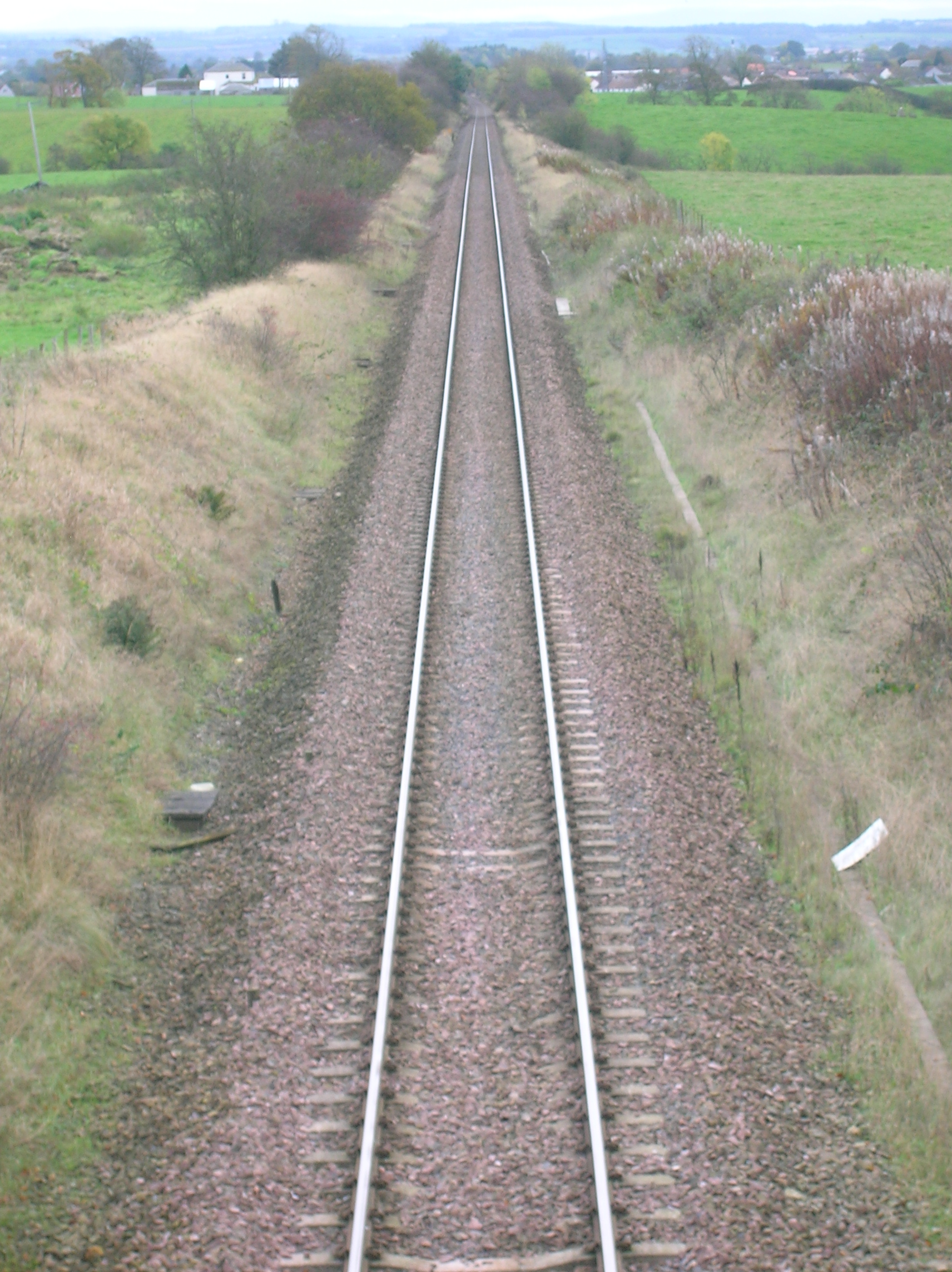
Kilmaurs from the Floors farm bridge

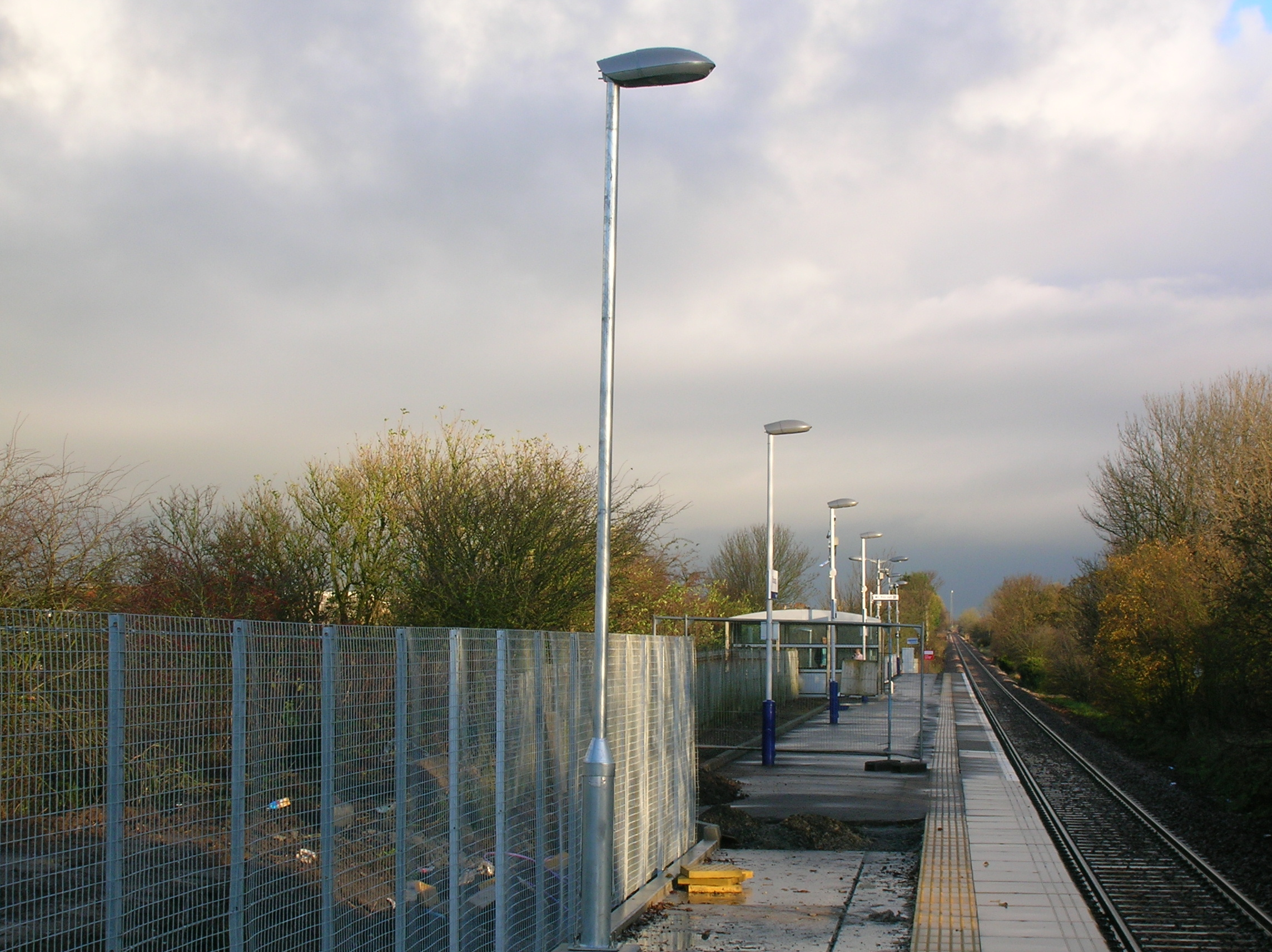
Platform extension works - looking towards Stewarton

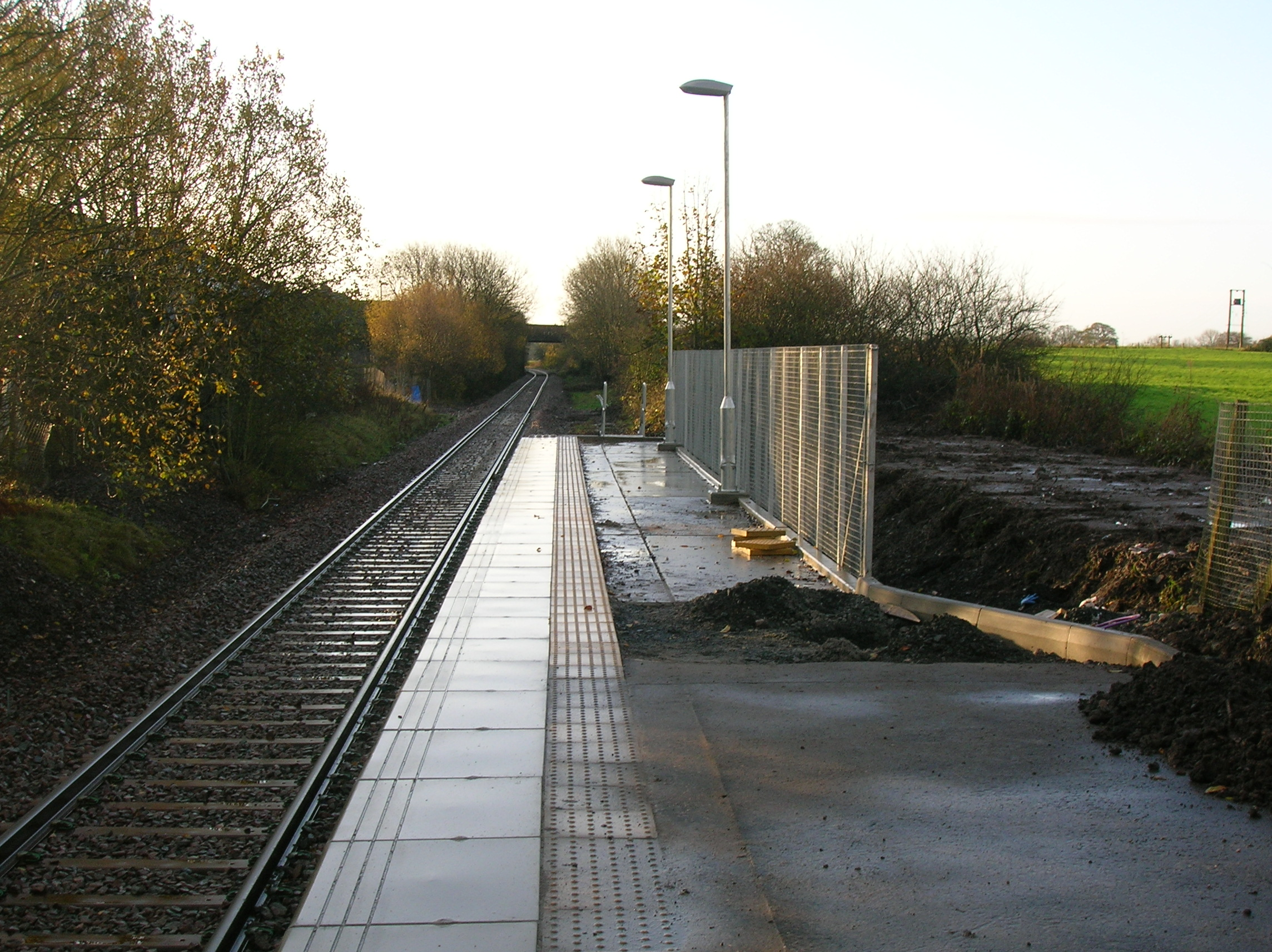
Platform extension works - looking towards Kilmarnock
