= Kilmarnock railway station =

Railway station in East Ayrshire, Scotland

Kilmarnock Scottish Gaelic: Cill Mheàrnaig
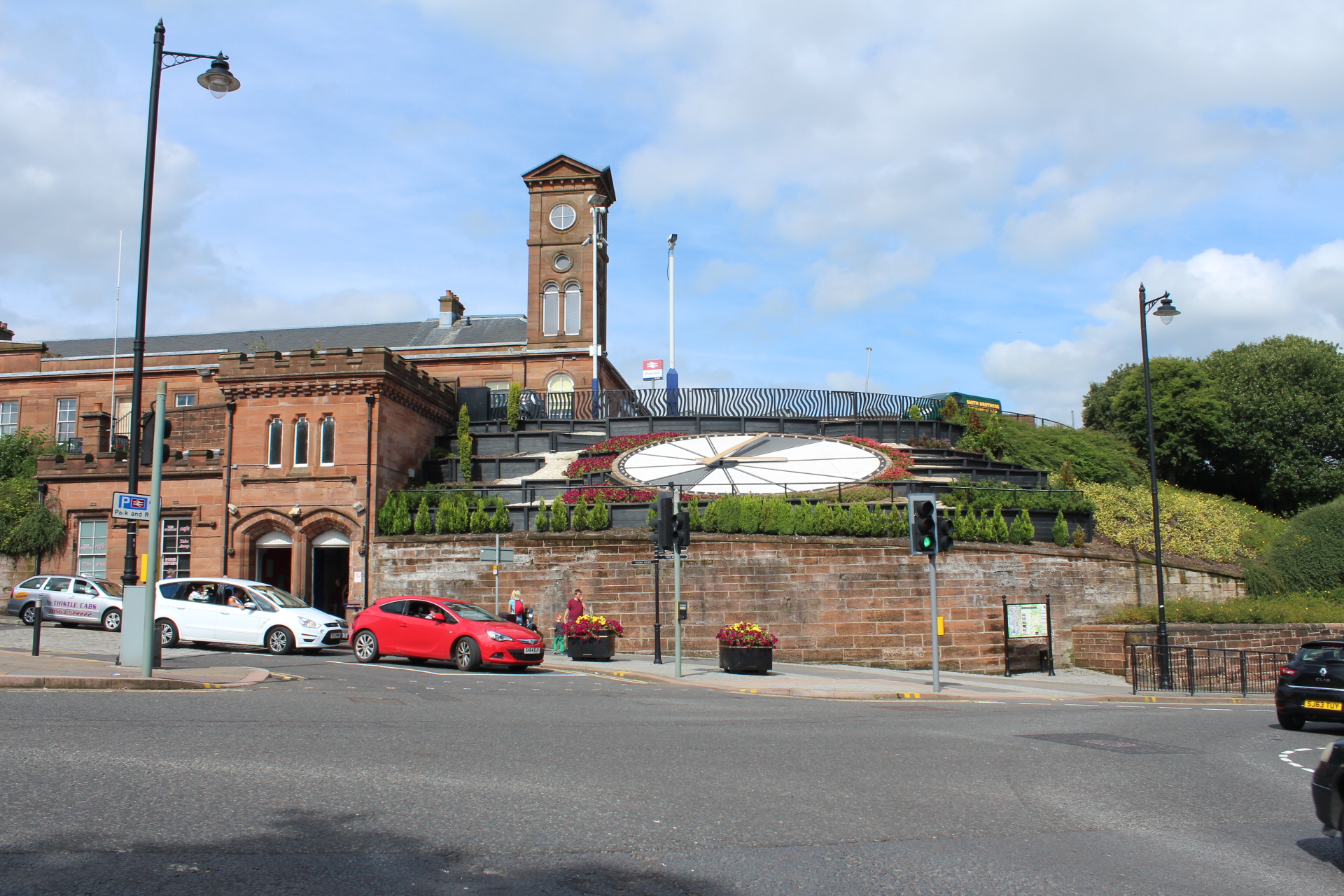
- Main entrance to the station from John Finnie Street (2016)

General information
- Location: Kilmarnock, East Ayrshire; Scotland
- Coordinates: 55.6124°N 4.4992°W
- Grid reference: NS427382
- Manager: ScotRail
- Transit authority: SPT
- Platforms: 4

Other information
- Station code: KMK

History
- Original company: Kilmarnock and Troon Railway & Glasgow, Paisley, Kilmarnock and Ayr Railway
- Pre-grouping: Glasgow and South Western Railway
- Post-grouping: LMS

Key dates
- 6 July 1812: Original station opened by K&TR
- 4 April 1843: Original station closed and second station opened by GPK&AR
- 20 July 1846: Second station closed and current station opened by GPK&AR

Passengers
- 2020/21: ▼78,842
- Interchange: 1,878
- 2021/22: ▲0.317 million
- Interchange: ▲5,304
- 2022/23: ▲0.355 million
- Interchange: ▲5,383
- 2023/24: ▲0.413 million
- Interchange: ▲6,325
- 2024/25: ▲0.467 million
- Interchange: ▲6,916

Listed Building – Category B
- Designated: 3 July 1980
- Reference no.: LB35928
Location
Notes
- Passenger statistics from the Office of Rail and Road

Kilmarnock railway station (Scottish Gaelic: Stèisean rèile Chille Mheàrnaig) is a railway station in the town of Kilmarnock, the largest and administrative centre of East Ayrshire situated on the west coast of Scotland. The station is managed by ScotRail, and is served by trains on the Glasgow South Western Line. It is located between Kilmaurs to the north, Troon to the south west, and Auchinleck to the south east, and is sited 33 miles 59 chains (54.3 km) from the former Glasgow Bridge Street station, measured via Dalry.

== History ==
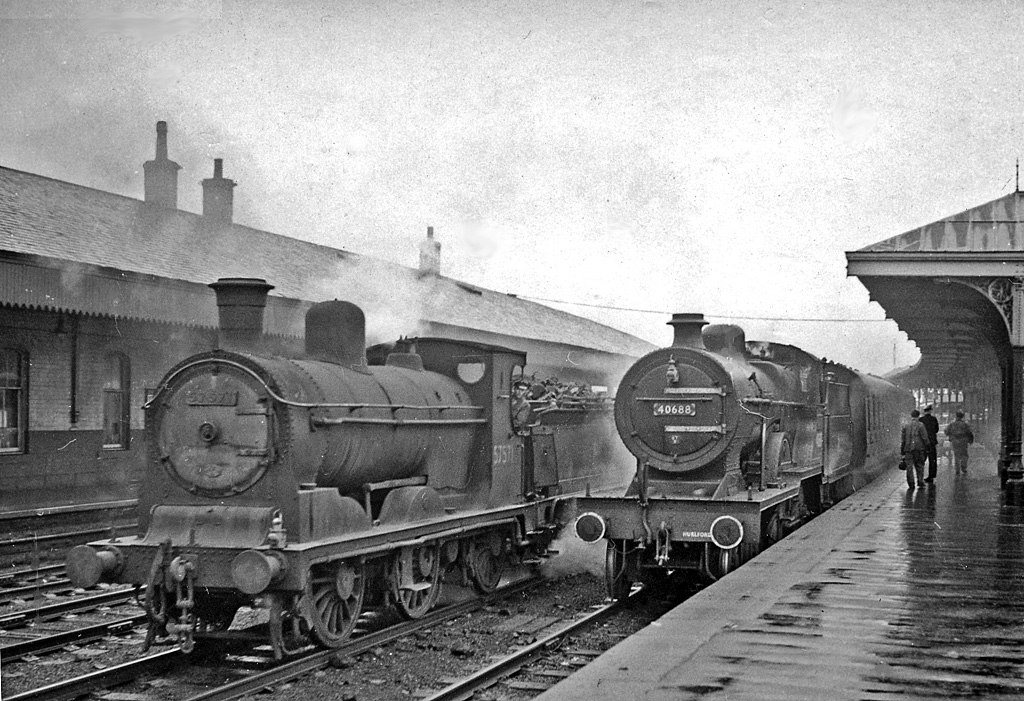
Local passenger and goods trains in 1957

The first station in Kilmarnock was opened by the Kilmarnock and Troon Railway on 6 July 1812, one of the earliest stations in Scotland. It was replaced by the Glasgow, Paisley, Kilmarnock and Ayr Railway on 4 April 1843. with the opening of their main line from Dalry.

The third and current station was opened on 20 July 1846 by the Glasgow, Paisley, Kilmarnock and Ayr Railway – this was connected to Ardrossan via Irvine two years later and to Carlisle via Dumfries & Gretna Junction in 1850. The current route to Glasgow (via Barrhead) – the Glasgow and Kilmarnock Joint Railway was completed in 1871 jointly by the G&SWR and Caledonian Railway.

Services on the Irvine branch and via the old main line to Dalry both fell victim to the Beeching Axe in the mid-1960s – the former closed to passengers on 6 April 1964 (and to all traffic in October 1965) and local trains on the latter were withdrawn on 18 April 1966. Services to the G&SWR terminus at Glasgow St Enoch also ended soon after (on 27 June), with services henceforth running to and from Glasgow Central. The old K&T line also lost its passenger service for several years (local trains ended on 3 March 1969), but these were subsequently reinstated in May 1975 when the boat trains from Stranraer to Carlisle were diverted from their former route via Annbank & Mauchline. The Dalry line remained in use for freight and occasional long-distance passenger trains until 23 October 1973, when it was closed to all traffic and subsequently dismantled.

=== Viaduct ===
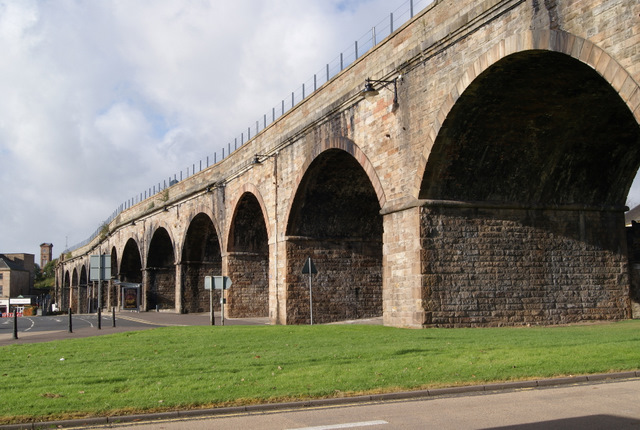
Kilmarnock railway viaduct

Constructed from 1843 until 1850, the Kilmarnock railway viaduct is a bridge crossing the town centre of Kilmarnock. It is a most distinctive feature of the town centre with 23 masonry arches. It was built in the 1840s to enable the Glasgow – Kilmarnock line to continue to Carlisle. At present, the viaduct is currently lit by blue lights when it is dark, which makes it more of a noticeable feature in the town, as part of the Kilmarnock town centre regeneration programme. The programme carried out on the viaduct was considered a "success".

In April 2012, the bridge's safety was upgraded after a man was seriously injured after jumping 40 ft from the top of the railway viaduct.

=== Station clock ===
Outside of the railway station, a clock is operated by East Ayrshire Council and ScotRail. In 2011, the clock received a grant from the Railway Heritage Trust to undergo a regeneration scheme that began in late 2011 and was completed in March 2012.

Despite an expensive upgrade in 2008, it was announced in December 2022 following a full cabinet meeting of East Ayrshire Council that the station clock at the Kilmarnock railway station was to be removed and landscaped "with immediate affect" due to continuous technical difficulties preventing the clock and its LED lighting from working properly.

== Facilities ==
The station is fully staffed seven days a week with a ticket office. A self-service ticket machine is also provided for use outside opening hours and for collecting pre-paid tickets. The Kilmarnock Station Railway Heritage Trust have turned the Station building into Kilmarnock Station Community Village, services include counselling services, a model shop and gaming centre, an Active Travel HUB, waiting room and public wi-fi access. Train information is offered via CIS displays, timetable posters, automated announcements and customer help points. Step-free access is available to all platforms.

== Passenger volume ==
Passenger volume at Kilmarnock
| | 2004–05 | 2005–06 | 2006–07 | 2007–08 | 2008–09 | 2009–10 | 2010–11 | 2011–12 | 2012–13 | 2013–14 | 2014–15 | 2015–16 | 2016–17 | 2017–18 | 2018–19 | 2019–20 | 2020–21 | 2021–22 | 2022–23 | 2023–24 | 2024–25 |
|---|---|---|---|---|---|---|---|---|---|---|---|---|---|---|---|---|---|---|---|---|---|
| Entries and exits | 462,070 | 455,106 | 437,685 | 407,463 | 397,042 | 410,154 | 520,128 | 587,956 | 603,018 | 554,708 | 612,376 | 593,410 | 588,618 | 619,354 | 609,292 | 617,746 | 78,842 | 316,898 | 355,414 | 412,662 | 467,114 |
| Interchanges | 10,946 | 12,892 | 13,218 | 10,049 | 12,371 | 10,428 | 9,927 | 10,852 | 11,530 | 11,360 | 13,555 | 12,138 | 17,323 | 19,369 | 16,952 | 18,280 | 1,878 | 5,304 | 5,383 | 6,325 | 6,916 |

The statistics cover twelve month periods that start in April.

== Services ==
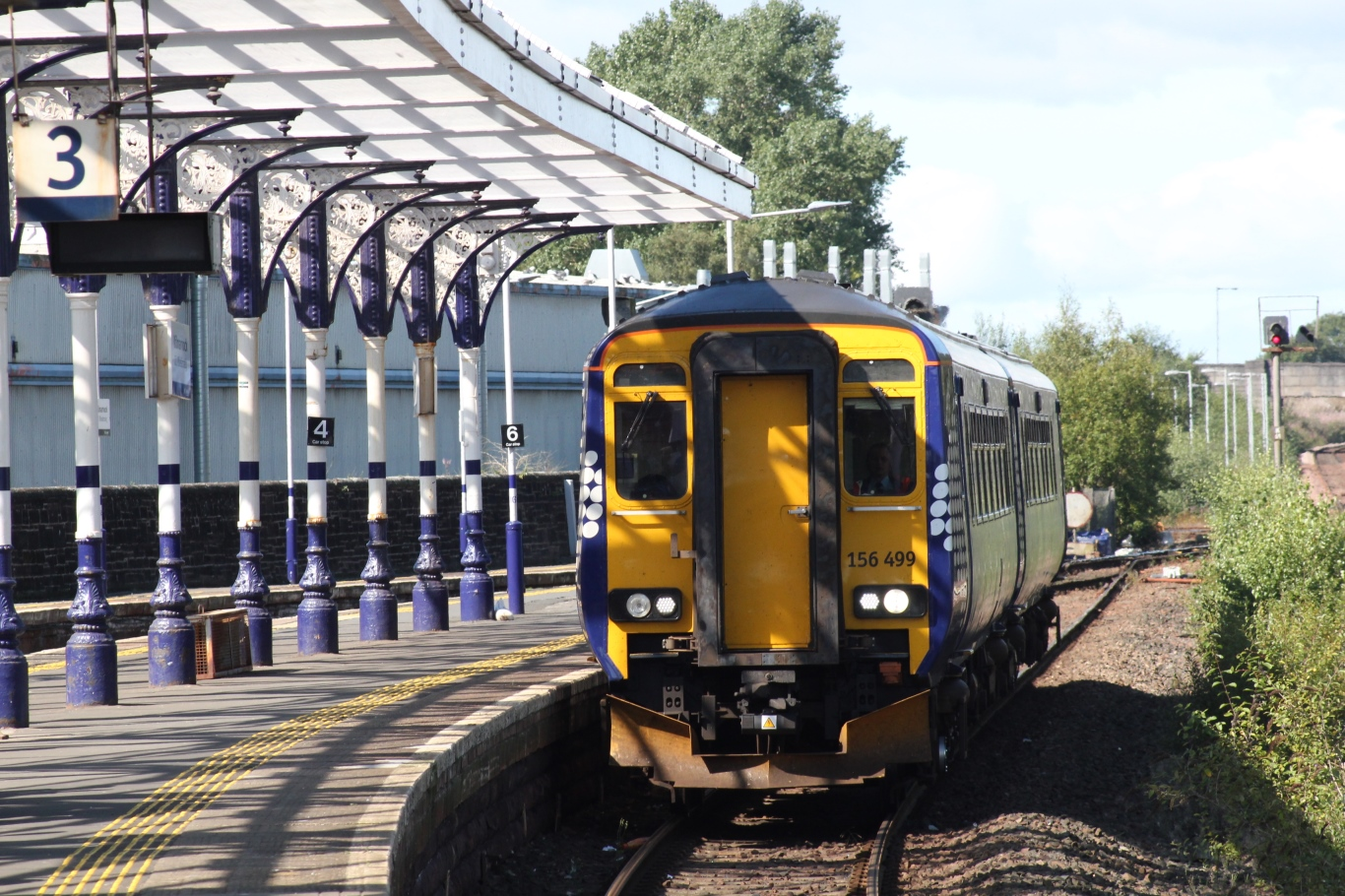
A Class 156 with a train from Glasgow to Carlisle

On weekdays and Saturdays northbound, there are 2 trains per hour to/from Glasgow Central for most of the day with journey times taking between 40 and 50 minutes depending the service taken. There are 9 trains per day south of Kilmarnock towards Dumfries and Carlisle, 6 trains go to Carlisle and 2 trains go to Dumfries. These operate every 2 hours with extras at peak times. Westbound, There is a 2 hourly service to Ayr with most of these continuing to Girvan while 1 per day terminates at Ayr while 2 per day continue to Stranraer. On Sundays, there is 1 train per hour to Glasgow calling at all stations except Crossmyloof. Southbound, There is a very limited service of just 2 trains per day to Dumfries and Carlisle. There is no service to Ayr, Girvan or Stranraer.

| Preceding station | National Rail | Following station |
|---|---|---|
| Troon | ScotRail; Glasgow South Western Line | Auchinleck |
| Kilmaurs | ScotRail; Glasgow South Western Line | Auchinleck |
| | Historical railways | |
| Connection with GPK&AR | Caledonian and Glasgow & South Western Railways; Glasgow, Barrhead and Kilmarnock Joint Railway | Kilmaurs; Line and station open |
| Hurlford; Line open; station closed | Glasgow and South Western Railway; Glasgow, Paisley, Kilmarnock and Ayr Railway | Crosshouse; Line and station closed |
| Gatehead; Line open; station closed | Glasgow and South Western Railway; Kilmarnock and Troon Railway | Connection with GPK&AR |

== Further links ==
- Brailsford, Martyn, ed. (December 2017) [1987]. Railway Track Diagrams 1: Scotland & Isle of Man (6th ed.). Frome: Trackmaps. ISBN 978-0-9549866-9-8.
- Butt, R. V. J. (October 1995). The Directory of Railway Stations: details every public and private passenger station, halt, platform and stopping place, past and present (1st ed.). Sparkford: Patrick Stephens Ltd. ISBN 978-1-85260-508-7. OCLC 60251199. OL 11956311M.
- Caton, Peter (2018). Remote Stations. Leicestershire: Matador. ISBN 978-1-78901-408-2.
- Jowett, Alan (March 1989). Jowett's Railway Atlas of Great Britain and Ireland: From Pre-Grouping to the Present Day (1st ed.). Sparkford: Patrick Stephens Ltd. ISBN 978-1-85260-086-0. OCLC 22311137.
- Jowett, Alan (2000). Jowett's Nationalised Railway Atlas (1st ed.). Penryn, Cornwall: Atlantic Transport Publishers. ISBN 978-0-906899-99-1. OCLC 228266687.
