= Hollywood station =

Hollywood station may refer to multiple stations:

== United States ==
In Los Angeles, California

- North Hollywood station, rapid transit and bus rapid transit station in Los Angeles, California
- Hollywood/Highland station, rapid transit station in Los Angeles, California
- Hollywood/Vine station, rapid transit station in Los Angeles, California
- Hollywood/Western station, rapid transit station in Los Angeles, California

Elsewhere in the United States

- Hollywood station (Florida), train station in Hollywood, Florida
- Hollywood station (Illinois), Metra station in Brookfield, Illinois
- Hollywood/NE 42nd Ave station, bus and light rail station in the Hollywood District of Portland, Oregon

== United Kingdom ==
- Holywood railway station (Northern Ireland), in County Down, Northern Ireland
- Holywood railway station (Scotland), a disused station in Dumfries and Galloway, Scotland

== See also ==
- Hollywood (disambiguation)
