= Mennock Lye Goods Depot =

Railway freight facility in Scotland

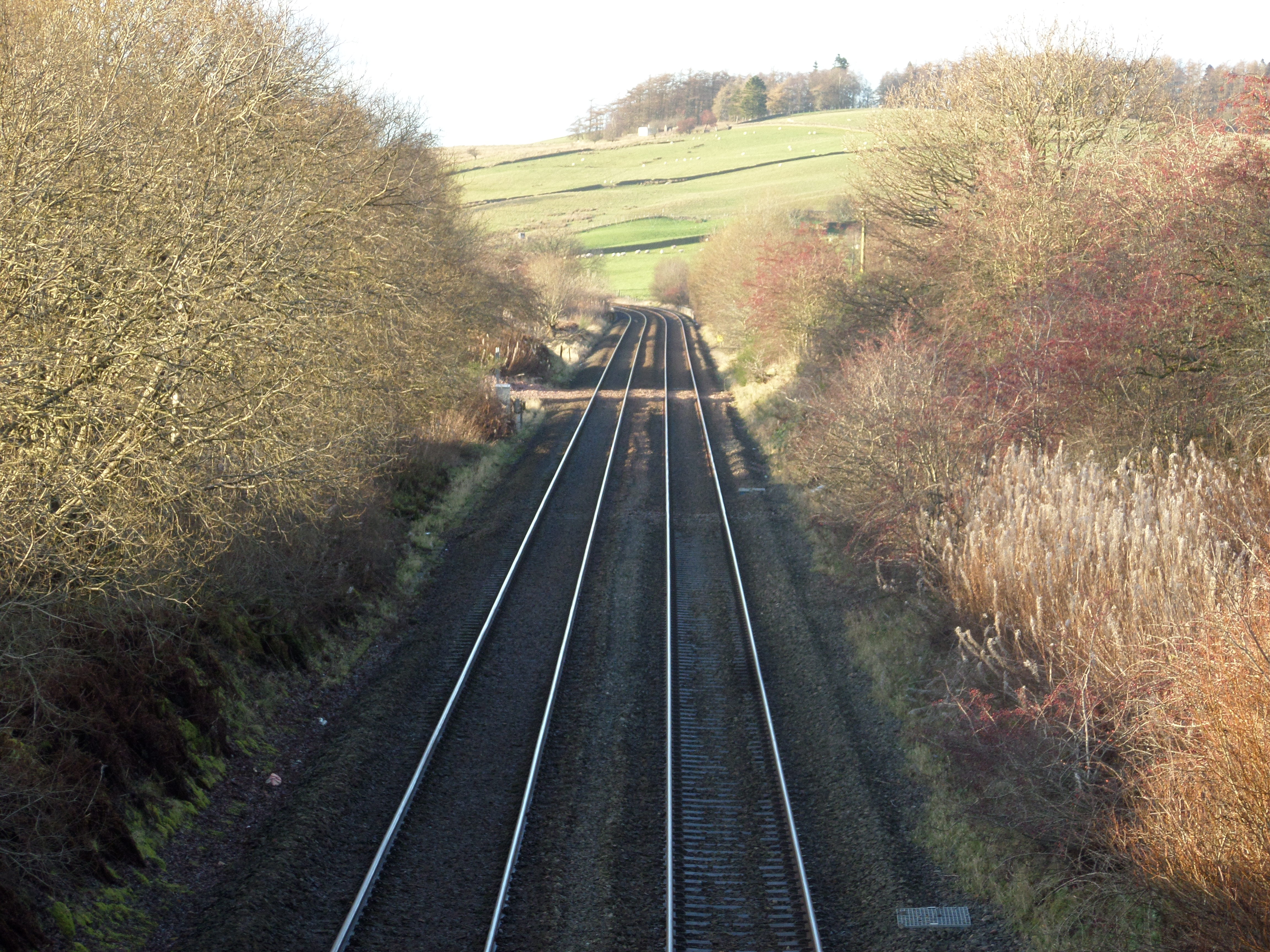

General information
- Location: Mennock, Dumfries and Galloway; Scotland
- Coordinates: 55.351528°N 3.8790925°W
- Grid reference: NS809079
- Platforms: 0

Other information
- Status: Disused

History
- Original company: GD&CR
- Pre-grouping: G&SWR
- Post-grouping: LMS

Key dates
- 28 October 1850: Opened
- 19 February 1949: Goods services withdrawn

Mennock Lye Goods Depot or Mennock Siding was a railway freight facility located off the A76 in the hamlet of Mennock that lies circa two miles (three km) south-east of Sanquhar, Dumfries and Galloway, Scotland. Situated 68 miles (109 km) from Glasgow it served the industrial and agricultural requirements for transportation in the vicinity of Mennock and the surrounding rural area, originally on behalf of the Glasgow, Dumfries and Carlisle Railway. The goods depot was located on a section of line with a falling southbound gradient of 1 in 160. No passenger railway station has been recorded for Mennock.

Although a remote location today the facility would have served freight transport requirements in the form of such items as lime for the fields, cattle, horse and sheep movements, milk delivery, coal transport movements and related items, etc. The Glasgow, Dumfries and Carlisle Railway opened sidings at Mennock for the Leadhills and Wanlockhead mines on 28 October 1850. The lead mines lay about 5 miles (8 km) to the northeast via the steep Mennock Pass. The siding is listed as a public goods station + F for furniture vans and any other road vehicle needing a flat wagon, implying that the siding had an end loading dock.

Bill Lockhart was an occasional signalman at the Mennock box as traffic required in the late 1920s and recalled an occasion when lambs to be loaded into cattle trucks from the pens, however they bolted onto the tracks and had to be rounded up by the farmer and his sheep dogs. Thankfully traffic was quiet.

== Infrastructure and working ==
The OS maps of 1898 shows on the eastern side or old 'Up line' a signal box and signals at the location with a rectangular building on the western side or old 'Down line'. From 3 October 1983 all 'Up lines' became 'Down Lines' and vice versa. Road access was a 'T' junction off the main road running past the school to the depot, secured by a gate. In 1856 no signal box or signals are shown although the building on the western side exists that was most likely the goods depot office.

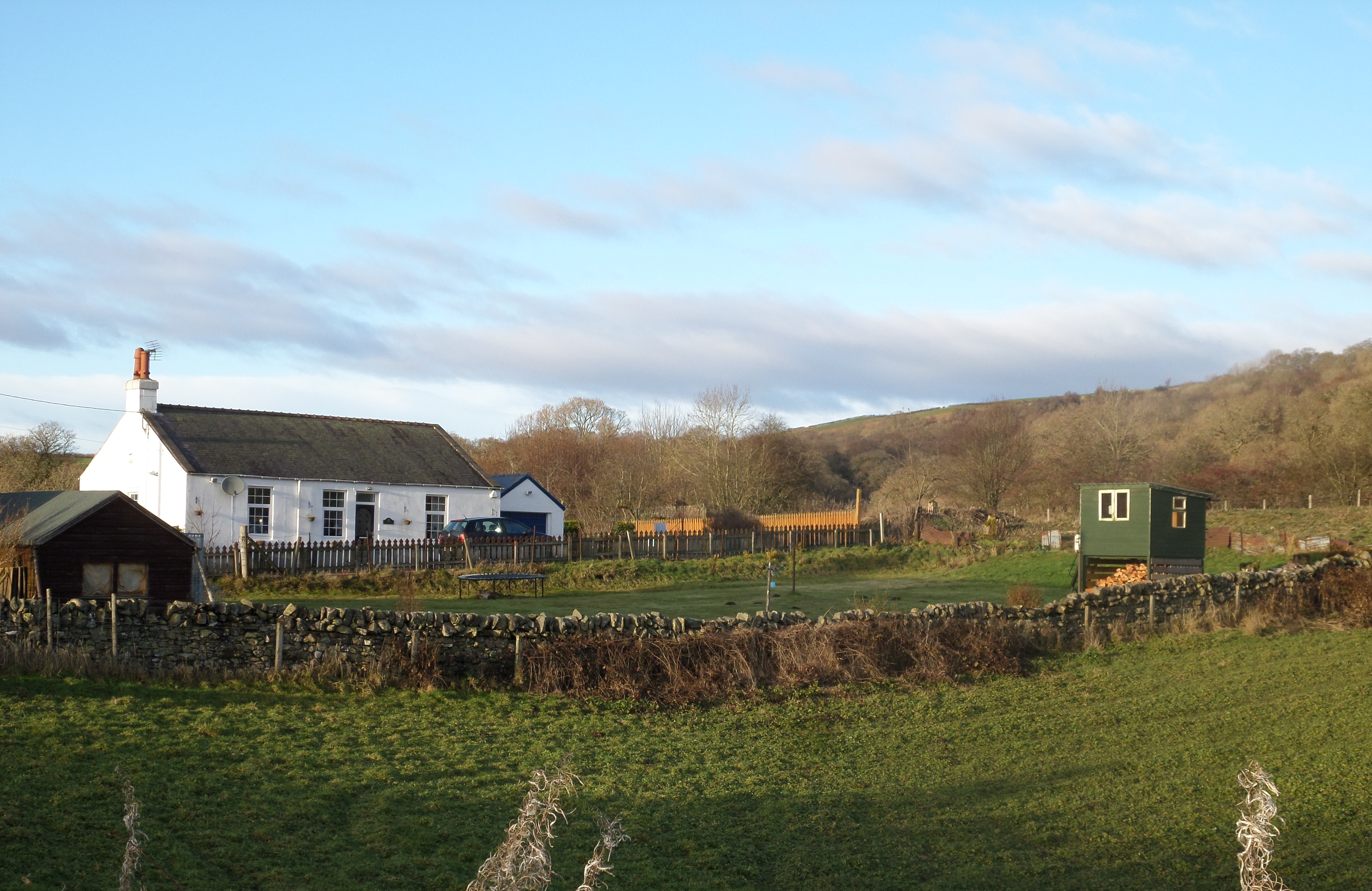
Goods Depot cottages and old entrance

Only minor infrastructure was present as might be expected at such a remote location with the double track main line, one siding running off and branching to two loading docks to the west and an access to the depot off the main road. A second short siding ran off on the western side in 1856, lifted by 1898. A track layout diagram of Mennock in 1935 shows the signal box and eleven signals of one sort or another. On the old 'Down Line' a siding running up to the Mennock Burn has been lifted. In LMS days a crossover was present.

The two cottages at the entrance have a path running directly into the depot and were likely to have been accommodation for railway workers. The combined cottages are known as 'Mennock Lye'.

A road over bridge lies a little way to the south carrying the B797 Mennock Pass road to Leadhills and Wanlockhead. A toll house at that date stood just to the north of the junction on the western side, entered by an unusual walled path and standing on a large masonry base that still exists. A weighing machine was located near this toll house, set into the road surface. By 1898 the toll house had closed and the weighing machine was no longer present. The depot stood close to the Mennock Water and the five arch viaduct that carries the line across, just downstream from the old Mennock Mill ruins.

Mennock was served by the 10.00 'Goods' from New Cumnock to Dumfries and the 5.10am Dumfries to New Cumnock in 1913. A 'minerals' from Dumfries to New Cumnock also called.

In 1898 the Mennock Lye signal box was open 'Day & Night' and had the call sign on the cabin speaking circuit of 'M K'. If a train was approaching, stopping or leaving on the opposite line when shunting operations were in progress then the train whistle was sounded at Mennock Lye in the form of 2 whistles if the activity was at the sidings. Mennock signal box lay 2 miles and 41 chains from the Sanquhar box, was closed from 6am on Sundays to 6am on Mondays and had a 'switching out' facility. It was 67 miles and 68 chains from Glasgow Bridge Street railway station as measured via Dalry and Kilmarnock.

The signal box closed on 10/09/1944 to be replaced by intermediate block signals operated by a ground frame. It was controlled from Carronbridge. The intermediate block signals were abolished from 17/10/1982. The signal box had been a G&SWR type 1, opened in 1881.

== History ==
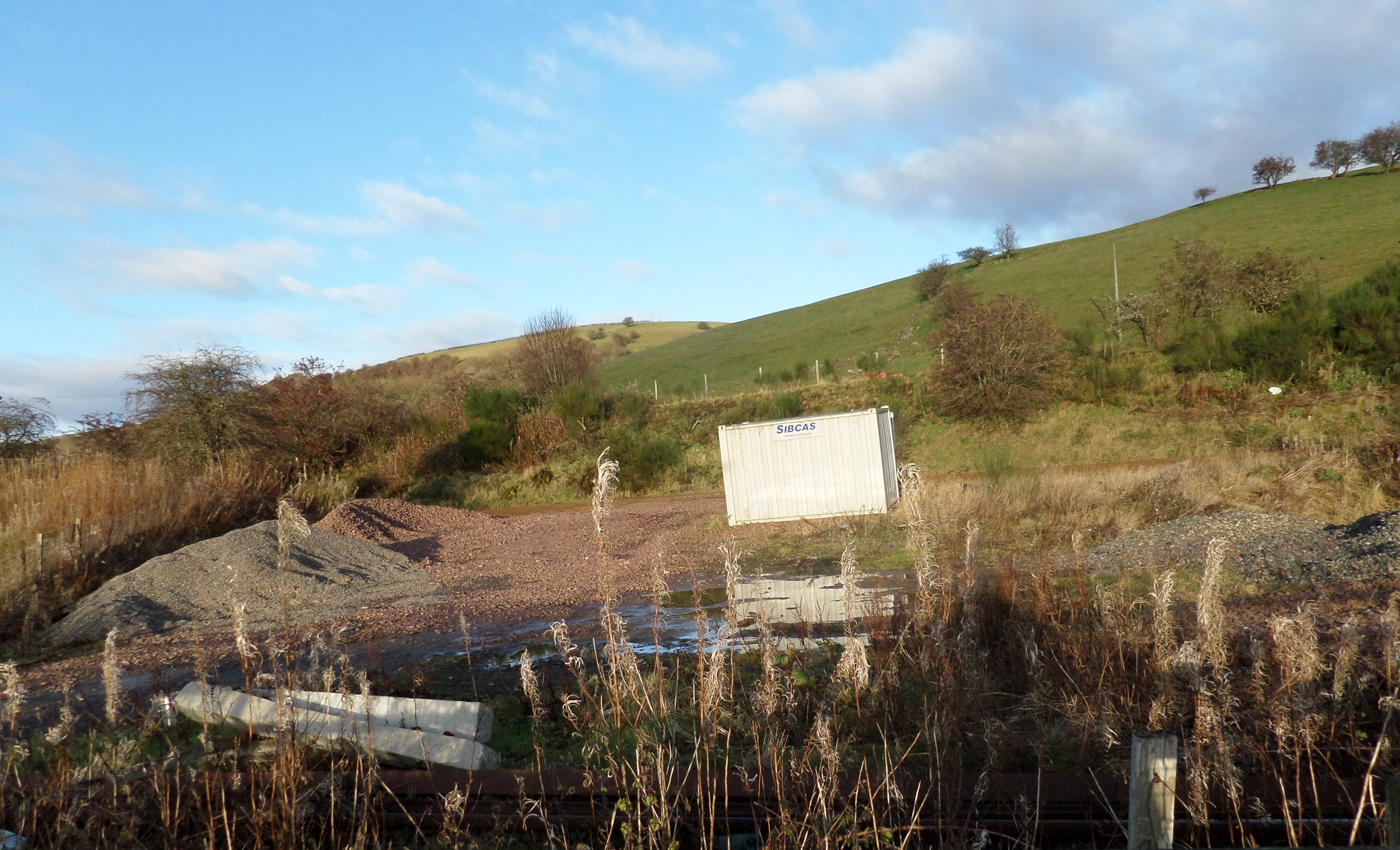
Mennock Lye engineers access

The goods depot at Mennock Lye was originally opened by the Glasgow, Dumfries and Carlisle Railway in 1850. Its construction originally related to the requirements of the Leadhills and Wanlockhead mines. It was listed as providing facilities for goods, furniture vans, carriages and portable engines. The line was opened by the Glasgow, Dumfries and Carlisle Railway that joined with the Glasgow, Paisley, Kilmarnock and Ayr Railway to become the Glasgow and South-Western Railway. It became part of the London Midland and Scottish Railway (LMS) during the Grouping of 1923 and finally part of British Railways in 1948.

On 7 Dec 1882 an accident took place at 'Mennock Siding' resulting in a passenger in the cattle train, a drover, being killed on the spot and six other passengers in the express train were more less injured. A large number of cattle were killed and waggons were wrecked. The sidings had been closed on 19 February 1949.

== The site today ==
The sidings have long been removed as has the signal box, track cross-over, etc., leaving plain double track. The ruins of the old goods depot office building still stands on the western side of the site. An engineers track access point and materials storage area exists slightly to the south of the old depot's location.

The present day running line designations are as stated to be the original format above, in that the easternmost or southbound line is the Up line, with the westernmost or northbound line being the Down line. This has been the case since at least early 1995.

== See also ==
- Garrochburn Goods Depot
- Gree Goods station
- Lissens Goods station

Preceding station	Historical railways	Following station
Sanquhar; Line and station open	Glasgow and South Western Railway; Glasgow, Dumfries and Carlisle Railway	Carronbridge; Line open and station closed
