= Mennock =

Coordinates: 55.352°N 3.881°W

Mennock: Scots: Menock
- Location within Dumfries and Galloway
- OS grid reference: NS 80785 08068
- Council area: Dumfries and Galloway
- Lieutenancy area: Dumfriesshire
- Country: Scotland
- Sovereign state: United Kingdom
- Post town: SANQUHAR
- Postcode district: DG4
- Dialling code: 01659
- Police: Scotland
- Fire: Scottish
- Ambulance: Scottish
- UK Parliament: Dumfriesshire, Clydesdale and Tweeddale
- Scottish Parliament: Dumfriesshire

Mennock is a small village or hamlet which lies 2 miles (3.2 km) south-east of Sanquhar on the A76, in Dumfriesshire, in the District Council Region of Dumfries and Galloway, southwest Scotland. Its original nucleus are the old smithy and corn mill with associated buildings. The site is dominated by the A76 that runs through the centre of Mennock. The village has expanded in recent years with housing on the River Nith side of the A76.

== History ==
The village was known as 'Minnock Bridge' in 1886 and the river was recorded as 'Minnick Water' with its source 7 miles (11 km) away on the north-western slope of Lowther Hill. The water has its confluence here with the River Nith. The area is famous for its association with the Covenanters. A road overbridge lies a little way to the south carrying the B797 Mennock Pass road to Leadhills and Wanlockhead. A toll house stood just to the south of the junction on the western side. A weighing machine was located near this toll house, set into the road surface. By 1898 the toll house had closed and the weighing machine was no longer present.

Mennock Bridge School, later Mennock School, was situated near the old entrance to the Mennock Lye Goods Depot with the schoolhouse standing nearby. The Mennock War Memorial has the names of those who served and who died from the village as well as those who attended the school and were killed in WWI.

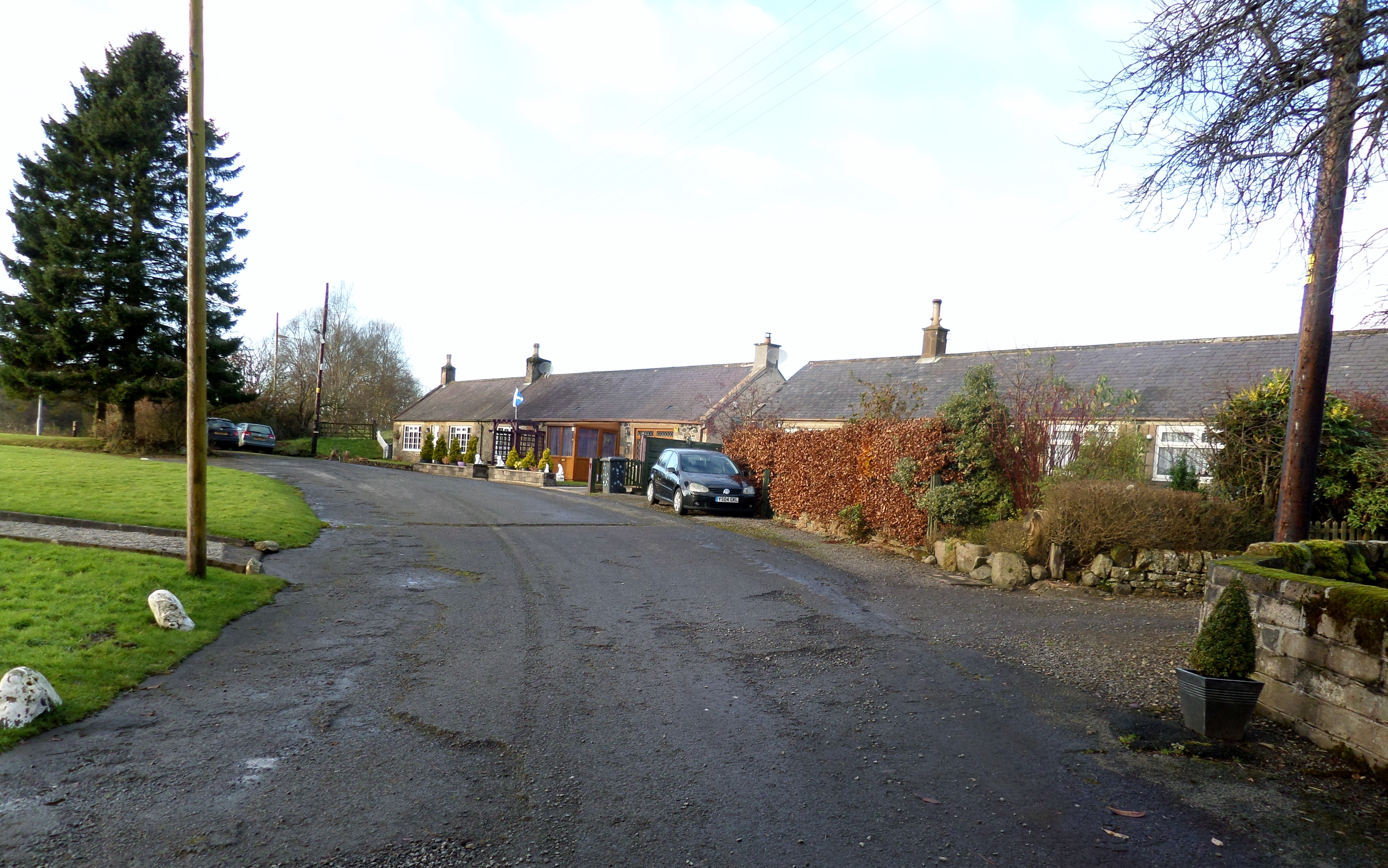
The old smithy in the mainstreet.

Glendyne lies about 2 miles (3.2 km) from Mennock and is famous as a onetime hiding place for persecuted Covenanters thanks to its isolation and its depth.

In 1832 and absent by the 1850s, a mill is shown on the Mennock Water near the point where the Sow Burn joins it, however by the 1850s a corn mill was present just above the Mennock Viaduct with a caul or weir and a ford. A lane ran up Kiln Hill from the site of Mennock Mill and joined the Mennock Pass road near the site of the old mill. Mennock Mill is no longer in use however the miller's house is still present. A small croft by the name of Ringbrae once stood near Mennock Wood, a path and footbridge connecting it to the village.

Eliock House stands on the western bank of the River Nith and was in the hands of the Dalzell family from circa 1388 to 1720 and the Veitch family were in residence until 1905, but by 1914 James Irving McConnel is listed as the owner followed by George W. Greenshields in the late 1930s. The oldest part of the house is a substantial tower, probably dating to the 16th century. Eliock is said to be the birthplace of James Crichton, commonly known as 'the Admirable Crichton', a polymath, highly skilled in languages, the arts, and sciences, murdered in 1582 at the age of 21.

Castle Gilmour (NS822093) once overlooked Mennock, named from the clan Gilmour, it stood near Auchengruith Farm however nothing now remains at the site.

The Cross Kirk of Mennock is a large cross, said to mark the site of an old chapel, composed of stones and earth and located on a flat area of ground at the bottom of the Glenclauch Brae, just off the Mennock Road. A stell or fold, once used for sheep in winter, stood near by.

== Transport ==
Mennock lies in Nithsdale, a natural communication corridor that has resulted in both roads and railways cutting through it. The Dumfries to Ayr road runs through on its way to Sanquhar. The Duke of Queensberry constructed around 22 miles (35 km) of new road and in addition a road (the B797) through the Mennock Pass to the county boundary and onward to Edinburgh. The village never had a passenger station the nearest today being Sanquhar and previously a station was present at Carron Bridge.

=== The Dempster Path ===
This ancient path runs from the village, under the railway viaduct, past the 19th century corn mill ruins and then continues up beside the Mennock Water and crosses the B797 after passing the site of the pre-1850s mill. Eventually the Dempster Path joins the B797 below Middlemoor Hill. The Dempster Road features on the OS 6" 1892-1905 edition marked as a footpath. It appears, as it avoids the toll house, to be an alternative to the then turnpiked B797 which runs closer to the Mennock Water. The name 'Dempster' suggest a much older origin as a 'Dempster' until 1746 was the official at Scottish baronial courts responsible for executing the judicial decisions and announced the "doom" as the sentence was called.

=== Mennock Lye Goods Depot ===
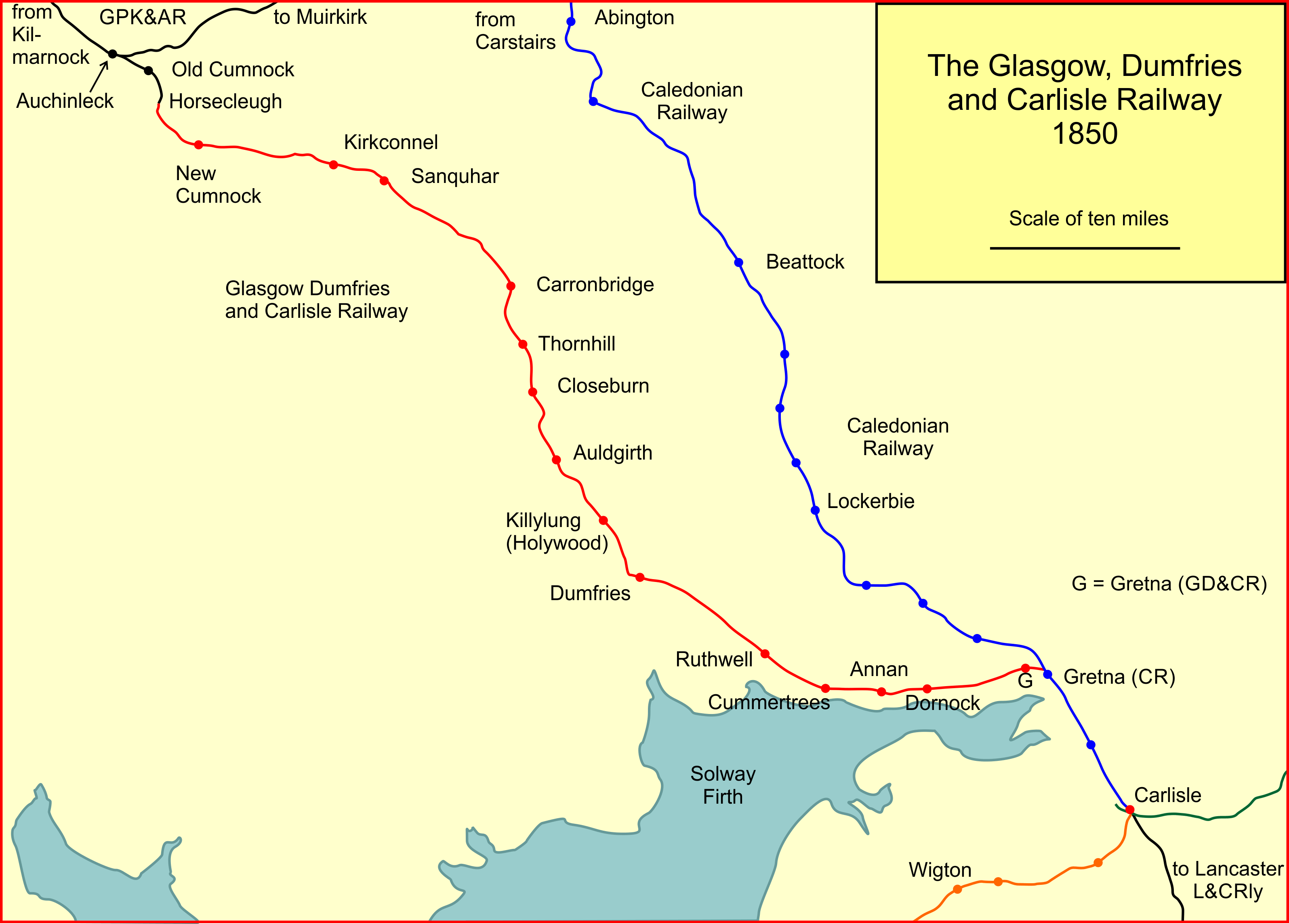
The Glasgow, Dumfries and Carlisle line

The Mennock Lye Goods Depot or Mennock Siding on the railway opened in 1850 and stood close to the Mennock Water and the five arched viaduct that carries the line across, just downstream from the old Mennock corn mill ruins.

The facility would have had transported such items as lime for the fields, cattle, horse and sheep movements, milk delivery, coal deliveries, etc. The Glasgow, Dumfries and Carlisle Railway originally opened the sidings for the Leadhills and Wanlockhead mines. The lead mines lay about 5 miles (8.0 km) to the northeast via the steep Mennock Pass. On 7 Dec 1882 an accident took place at 'Mennock Siding' resulting in a passenger fatality.

The sidings have long been removed as has the signal box, track cross-over, etc., leaving plain double track. The ruins of the old goods depot office building remains on the western side of the site. An engineers track access point and materials storage area exists slightly to the south of the old depot's location.

== Toponymy ==
The earliest recorded version of the Mennock Water name in 1660 is 'Minnock' and the derivation may be from the Scots Gaelic 'mèineach', meaning 'abounding in ore or mines'. Eliock may originate in the Scots Gaelic 'ailcheach' meaning 'stony place'.

== Micro-history ==
The Leadhills and Wanlockhead Railway has named a locomotive 'Mennock' in the honour of the connection of the mines with the village. 'Mennock' is a narrow gauge locomotive that was built by Hunlset-Barclay in 1994 and was used in the tunnelling work for London Olympic Park.

In British usage Mennock is technically a hamlet rather than a village as it has always lacked a formal dedicated church of its own.

== See also ==
- Mennock Lye Goods Depot
- Garrochburn Goods Depot
- Enterkinfoot and the Enterkin Pass
