= Carronbridge railway station =

Former railway station in Scotland

Coordinates: 55.2927°N 3.7652°W

Carronbridge
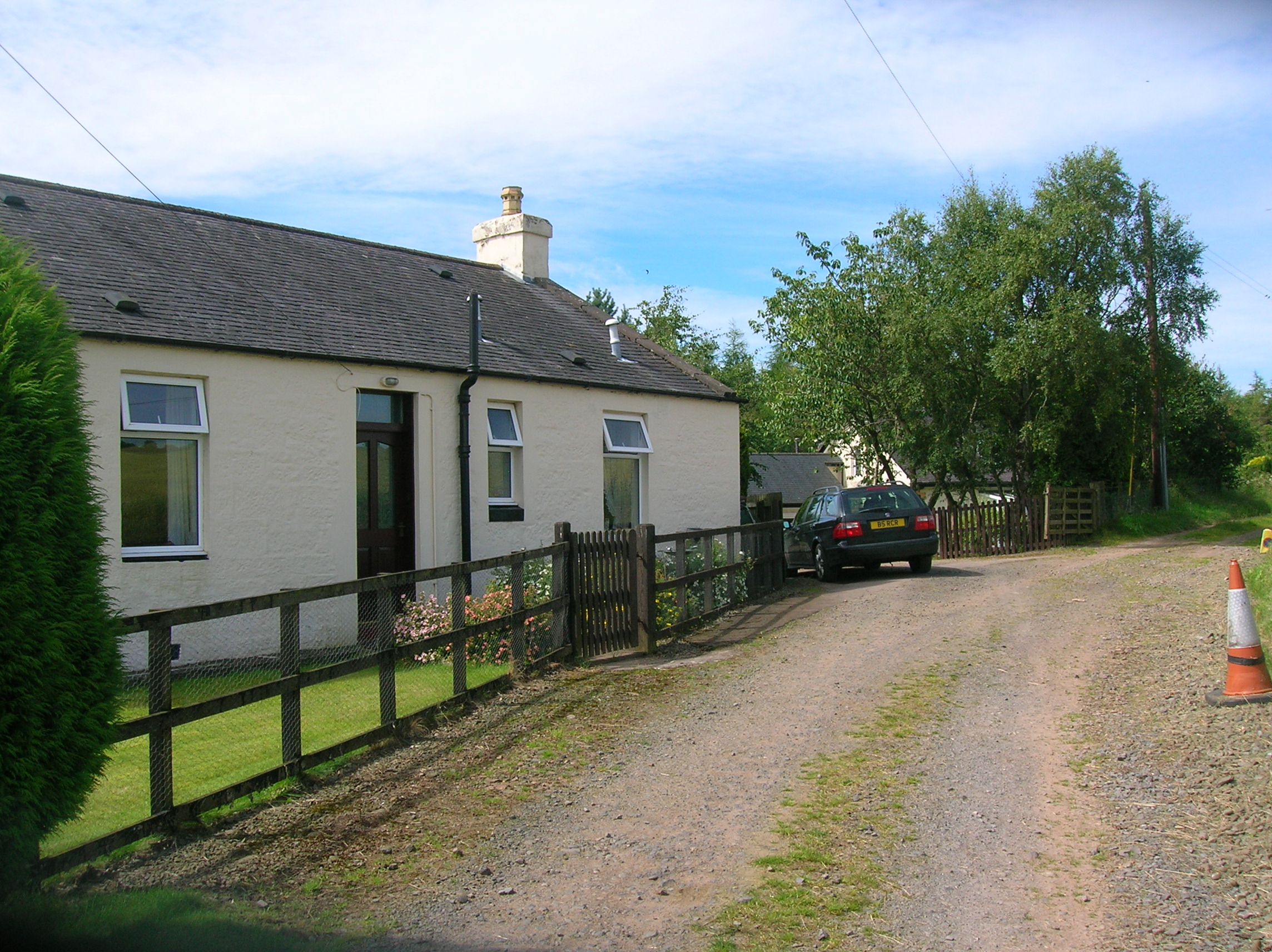
- Station buildings at Carronbridge

General information
- Location: Dumfries, Dumfries and Galloway; Scotland
- Grid reference: NS 88002 01263
- Platforms: 2

Other information
- Status: Disused

History
- Original company: Glasgow, Dumfries and Carlisle Railway
- Pre-grouping: Glasgow and South Western Railway
- Post-grouping: LMS

Key dates
- 28 October 1850: Opened
- 7 December 1953: Closed
Location

Carronbridge railway station was a railway station in Dumfries and Galloway north of Dumfries, serving the village of Carronbridge and district. The station lay a significant distance from the village of Carronbridge, however it also served a large rural area of scattered farms and cottages.

== History ==
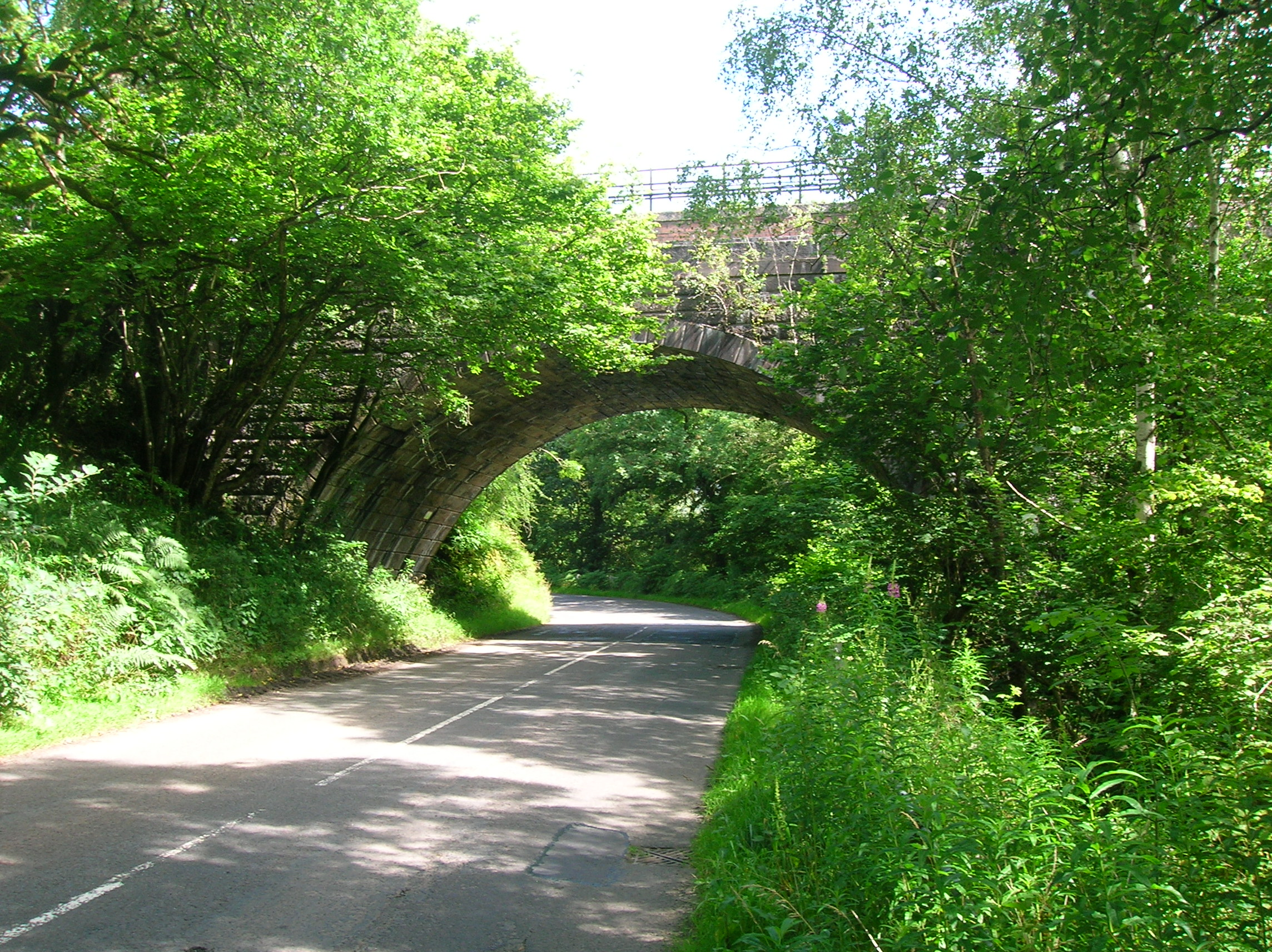
Part of the nearby railway viaduct.

This intermediate station on the double track Glasgow - Kilmarnock - Gretna ('Nith Valley') main line of the former Glasgow and South-Western Rly was opened as Carron Bridge Station on 28 October 1850. It was renamed Carronbridge Station on 1 January 1871, and closed to regular passenger traffic on 7 December 1953. The line remains in regular use by passenger and freight traffic. The station building has been converted into a private dwelling.

Carronbridge was opened by the Glasgow, Dumfries and Carlisle Railway, which then became part of the Glasgow and South Western Railway; in 1923 it became part of the London Midland and Scottish Railway at the Grouping, passing on to the Scottish Region of British Railways following the 1948 nationalisation of the railways. It was closed by British Railways in 1953.

The 1898 OS map shows several freight sidings, a goods shed and a signal box at Carronbridge. To the north was Mennock Lye Goods Depot however a passenger station never existed at Mennock.

== Railway Mishap 1966 ==
On Sunday 14 August 1966, the previous evening's 22:10 Glasgow Central – London Euston consisting of five seating coaches, eight sleeping cars and two parcels vans hauled by EE Type 4 locomotive No. D311 crashed into a landslide between Sanquhar and Carrondale at 00:30. The loco and first ten coaches were derailed. None of the 270 passengers and four train crew were injured.

== Micro-history ==
The Durisdeer Parish War Memorial is located on the roadside, close to the entrance to the old station.

== Services ==
| Preceding station | Historical railways | Following station |
|---|---|---|
| Sanquhar; Line open; station closed | Glasgow and South Western Railway; Glasgow, Dumfries and Carlisle Railway | Thornhill; Line open; station closed |

== See also ==
- Mennock Lye Goods Depot
