= Carron Water, Dumfriesshire =

River in Dumfries and Galloway, Scotland

Coordinates: 55.2594°N 3.7839°W

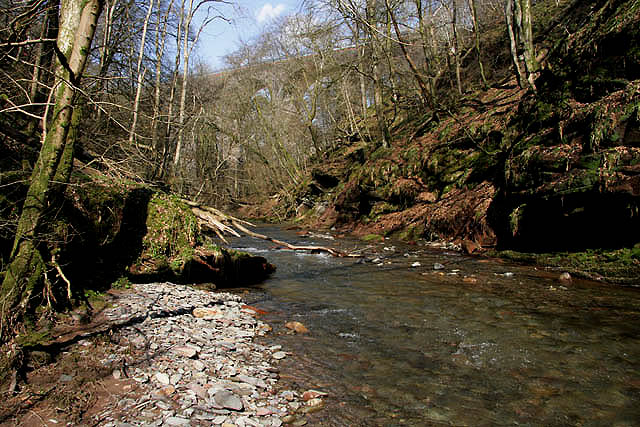
The Carton Water

The Carron Water (Scottish Gaelic: Carrann) is a tributary of the River Nith in southwest Scotland. It rises in the Dalveen Pass in the Lowther Hills as its headwater streams, the Dinabid Linn, Dalveen Lane and Lavern Burn join to flow southwards, to the west of the village of Durisdeer, to meet the Nith at Carronbridge.
