= Thornhill railway station (Scotland) =

Former railway station in Scotland

Coordinates: 55°15′00″N 3°44′53″W

Thornhill
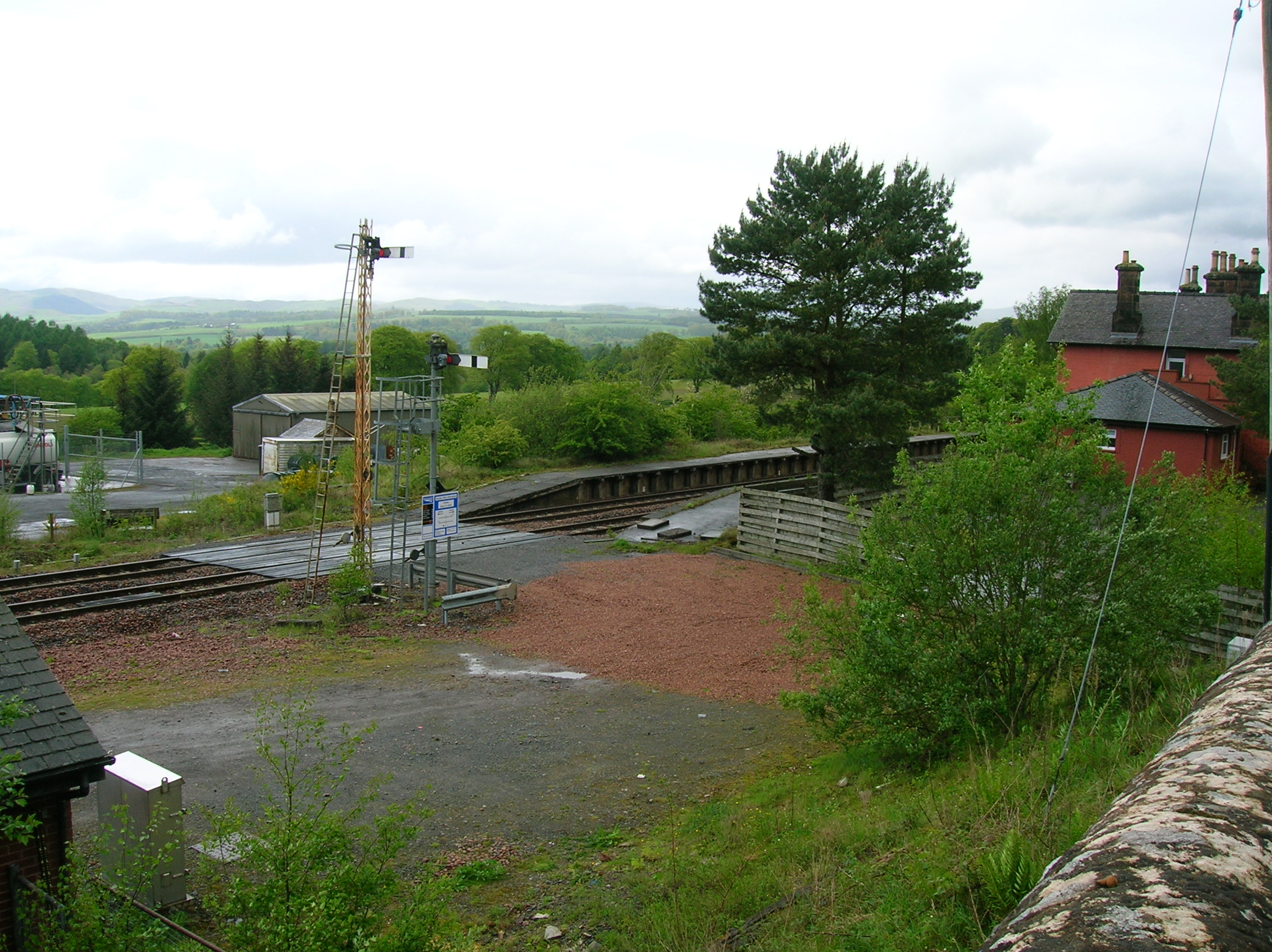
- Thornhill station Dumfries

General information
- Location: Thornhill, Dumfries and Galloway; Scotland
- Platforms: 2

Other information
- Status: Disused

History
- Original company: Glasgow, Dumfries and Carlisle Railway
- Pre-grouping: Glasgow & South Western Railway

Key dates
- 28 October 1850: Opened
- 6 December 1965: Closed
Location

Thornhill is a closed station. It served the country town of Thornhill in Dumfries and Galloway. The station site is a mile or so from the town. Four miles north of Thornhill is Drumlanrig Castle, home to the Duke of Buccleuch and Queensberry. The Glasgow and South Western main line rail route between Kilmarnock and Dumfries is forced to make a long detour to the east of Thornhill and through a long tunnel, rather than the more logical route nearer Thornhill town centre and up the Nith Valley, so as not to be seen from the Buccleuch estate. The distance of the station from Thornhill may be one reason that passenger use was light and stopping services ended in 1965. There was formerly a busy livestock market near to the station, which eventually closed around 2001.

In 2014, Dumfries and Galloway Council proposed creating a funding application to reopen the station.

== Views at the station in 2009 ==
The southbound loop has recently been opened to increase traffic paths on this line. The platforms, signal box and main building still stand at this closed station. Semaphore signalling is still used here.

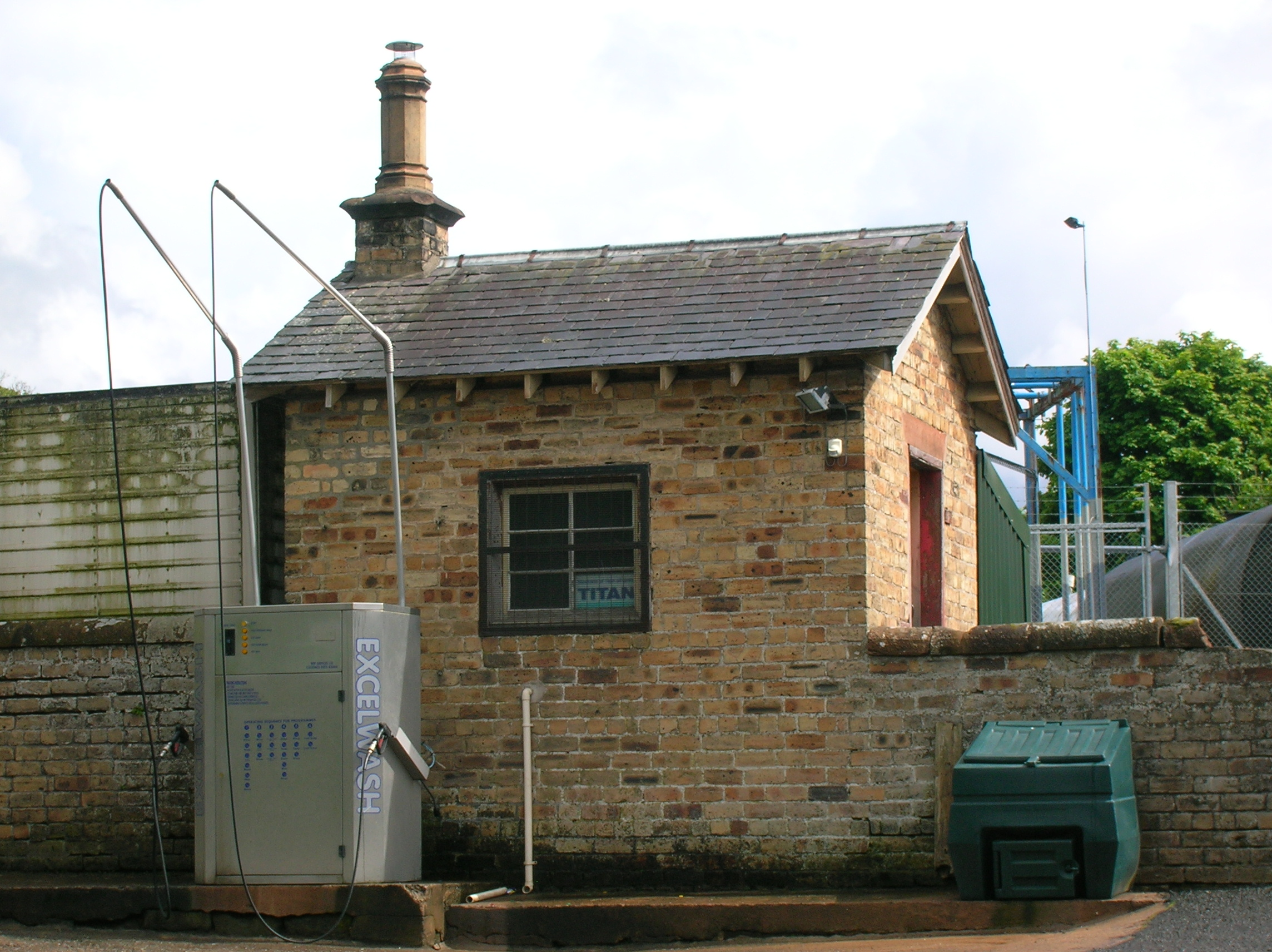
The old station goods yard

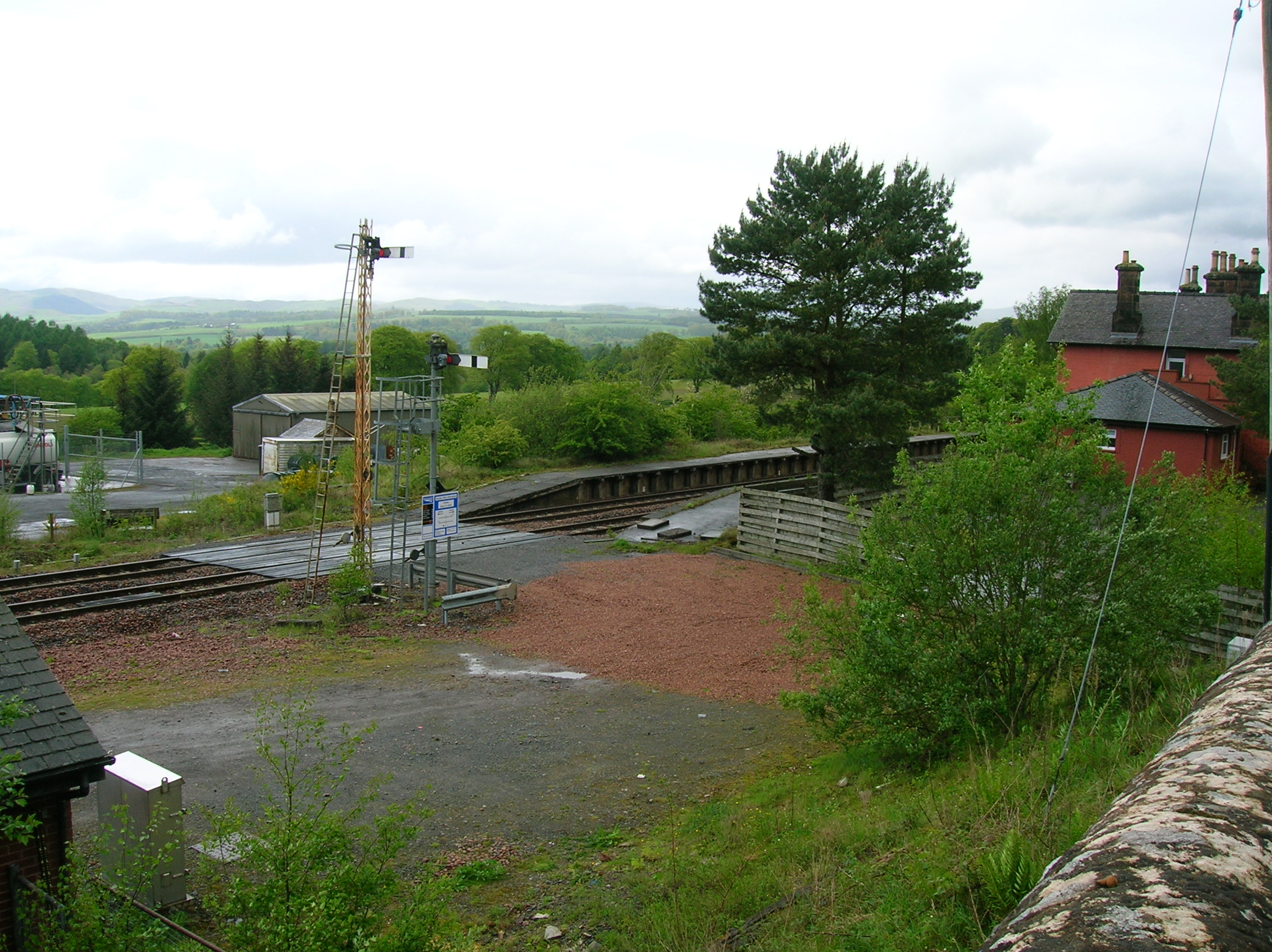
Thornhill station buildings

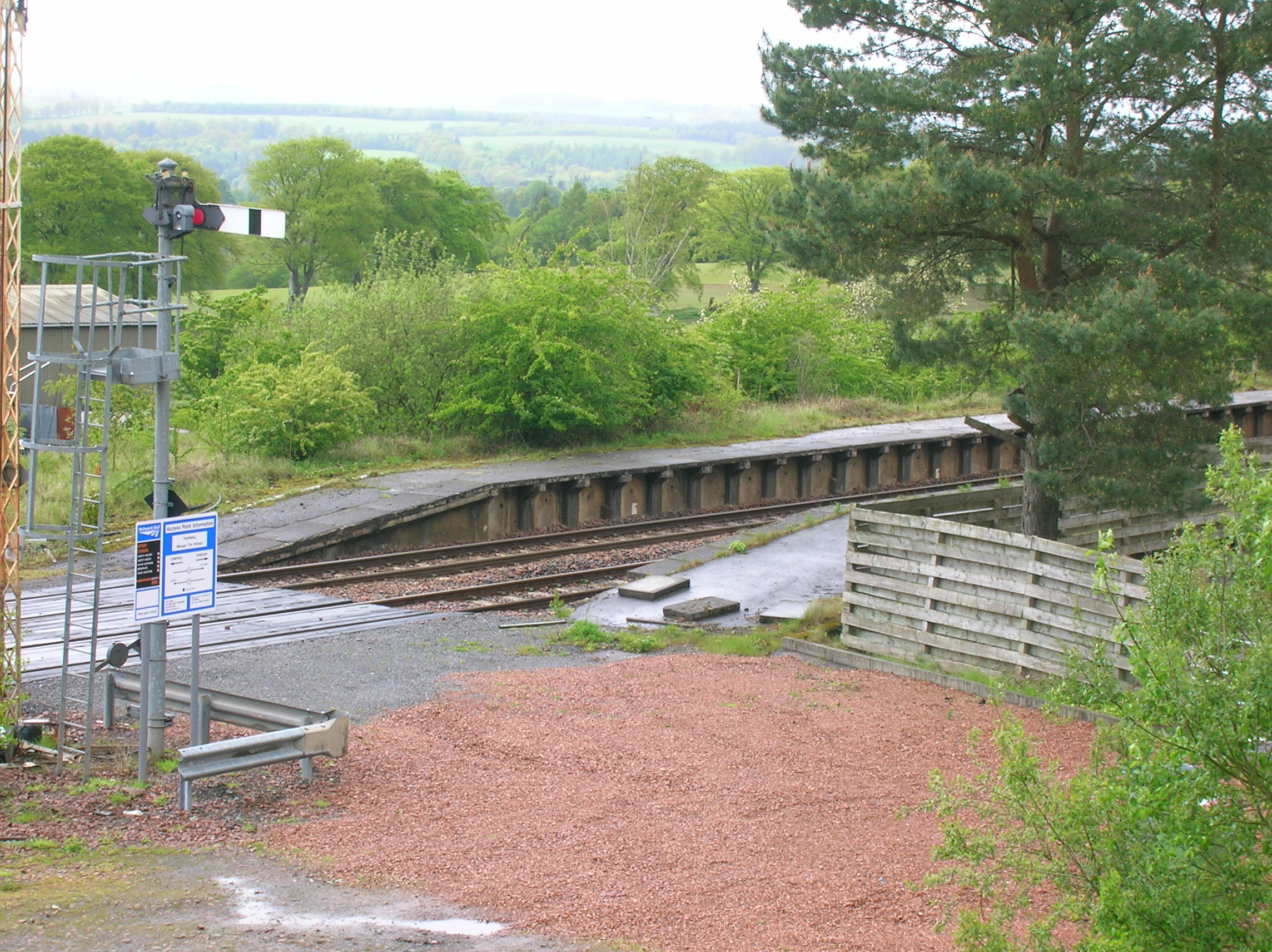
Thornhill station platform

== Re-opening ==
Suggestions have been made for a re-opening of the station.

Despite the positive case for reopening, some local residents opposed the plans in 2009, which involved some property development to pay for new a new station involving platforms to be built slightly north of the present station site.

In October 2016, the local community council in Thornhill released a survey where the village showed overwhelming support for the re-opening of the station. The current plans include building a new station slightly north of the old station.

Preceding station	Historical railways	Following station
Carronbridge; Line open; station closed	Glasgow and South Western Railway; Glasgow, Dumfries and Carlisle Railway	Closeburn; Line open; station closed

== See also ==
- List of closed railway stations in Britain
