= Carronbridge =

Village in Dumfries and Galloway, Scotland

Coordinates: 55.262°N 3.779°W

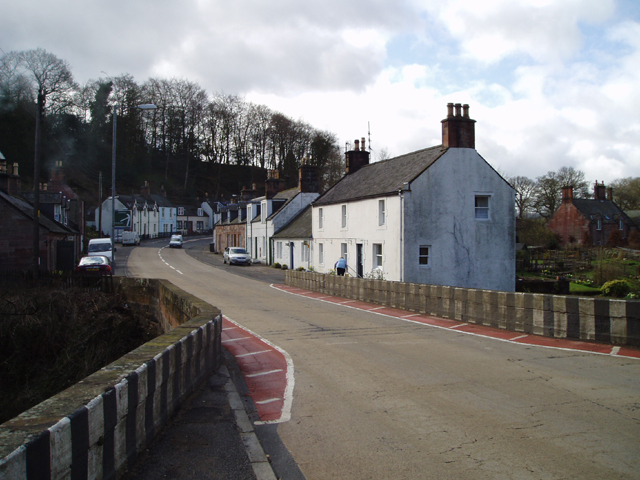
Carronbridge

Carronbridge is a village in the parish of Morton in Dumfries and Galloway, Scotland. The village is at the junction of the A76 and A702 roads approximately 1 mile (2 km) north of Thornhill. The hamlet of Enterkinfoot lies slightly to the north. To the west of the village the Carron Water flows into the River Nith. Carronbridge Sawmill is in the village and is a Category B listed building built in the 1850s for the Duke of Buccleuch's Drumlanrig estate.

Carronbridge station on the 'Nith Valley' line was located near the hamlet of Enoch and is also the site of the Carronbridge railway viaduct. The line remains open to passenger and freight traffic. A resident is David Vernon, known for his long-distance running and appearance on the Channel 4 show 'Countdown'.

South of the village are the remains of a Roman temporary camp. Adjacent to it is an indigenous farming enclosure, which appears to have been occupied in the Roman period. This is an interesting, possibly unique, example of a Roman fort co-existing with a native settlement.

== See also ==
- Drumlanrig Castle
- Tibbers Castle
- Carronbridge Roman Fort
