= Auldgirth railway station =

Disused railway station in Auldgirth, Scotland

Coordinates: 55.162°N 3.704°W

Auldgirth
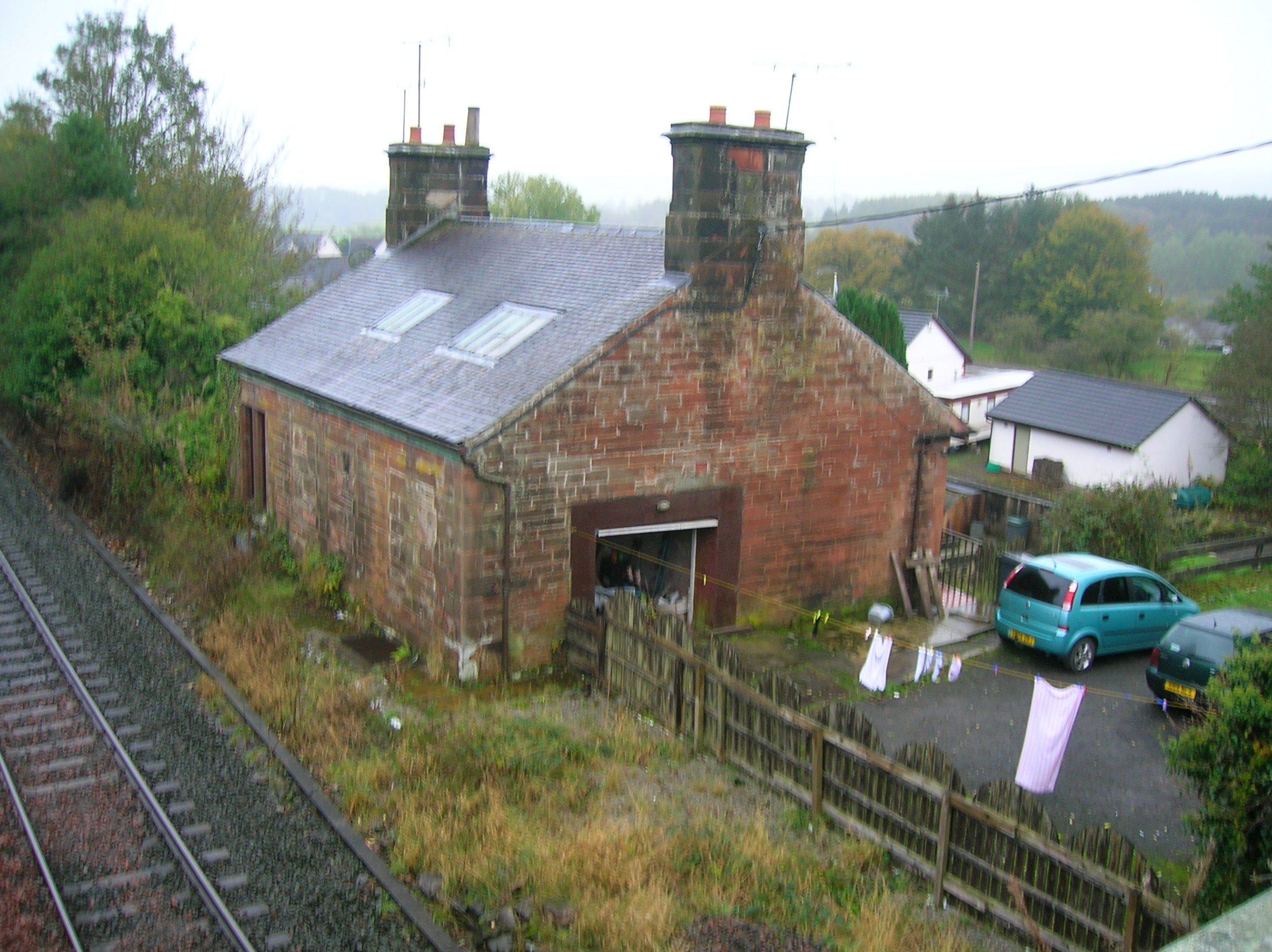
- Auldgirth old station building

General information
- Location: Auldgirth, Dumfries and Galloway; Scotland
- Grid reference: NX915866
- Platforms: 2

Other information
- Status: Disused

History
- Original company: Glasgow, Dumfries and Carlisle Railway
- Pre-grouping: Glasgow and South Western Railway
- Post-grouping: London Midland and Scottish Railway

Key dates
- 15 October 1849: Station opens
- 3 November 1952: Station closes
Location

Auldgirth railway station was a station which served Auldgirth, in the Scottish county of Dumfries and Galloway. It was served by trains on what is now known as the Glasgow South Western Line north of Dumfries. The latter station is now the nearest to Auldgirth.

== History ==
Opened by the Glasgow, Dumfries and Carlisle Railway, which became part of the Glasgow and South Western Railway it became part of the London Midland and Scottish Railway during the Grouping of 1923, passing on to the Scottish Region of British Railways during the nationalisation of 1948. It was then closed by British Railways.

== The site today ==
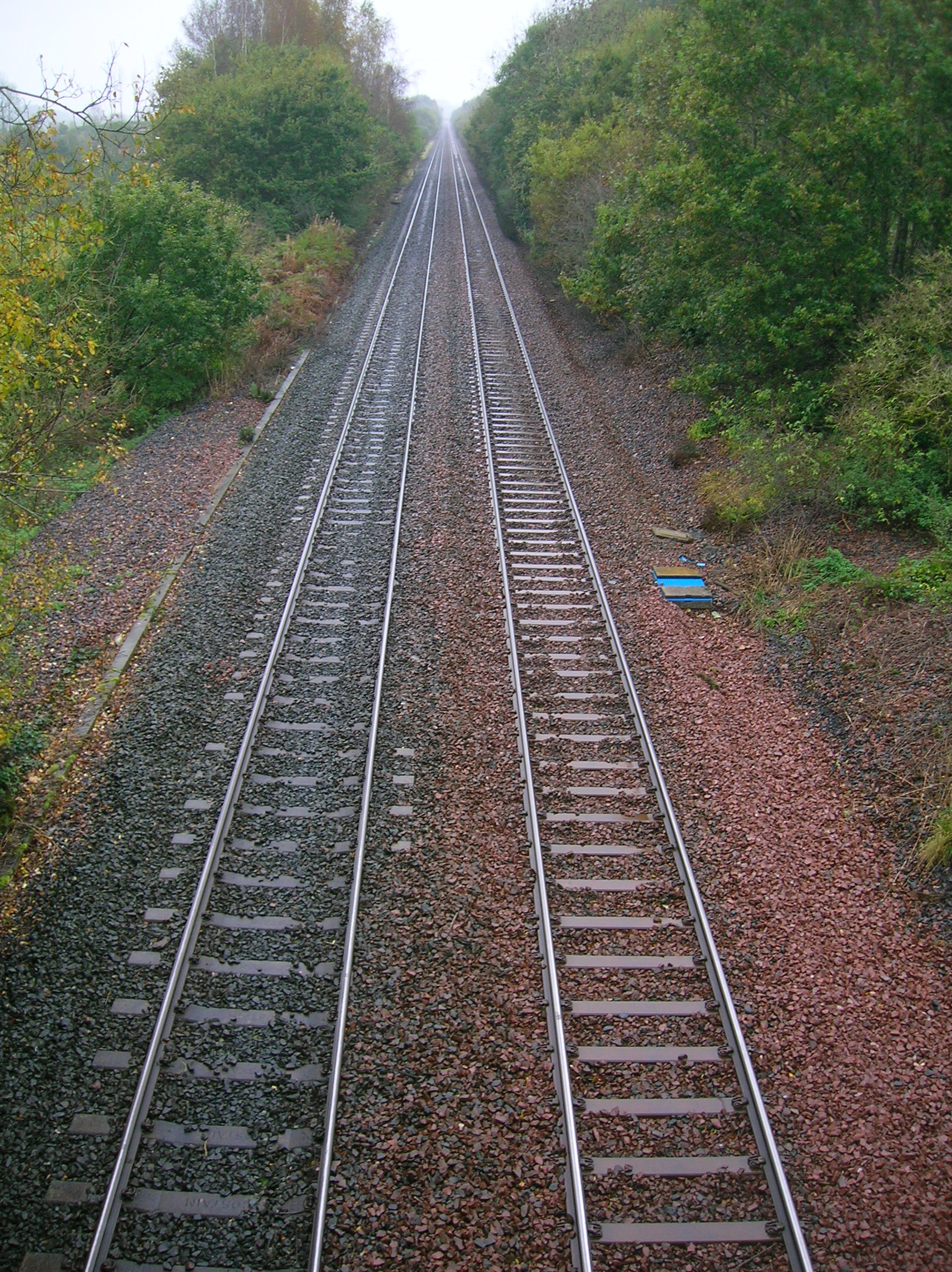
The view towards Thornhill from Auldgirth old station overbridge.

Trains still pass the site on the Glasgow South Western Line.

| Preceding station | Disused railways | Following station |
|---|---|---|
| Holywood | London Midland and Scottish Railway; Glasgow and South Western Railway; Glasgow, Dumfries and Carlisle Railway | Closeburn |
