= Closeburn railway station =

Former railway station in Scotland

Coordinates: 55.21261°N 3.73368°W

Closeburn
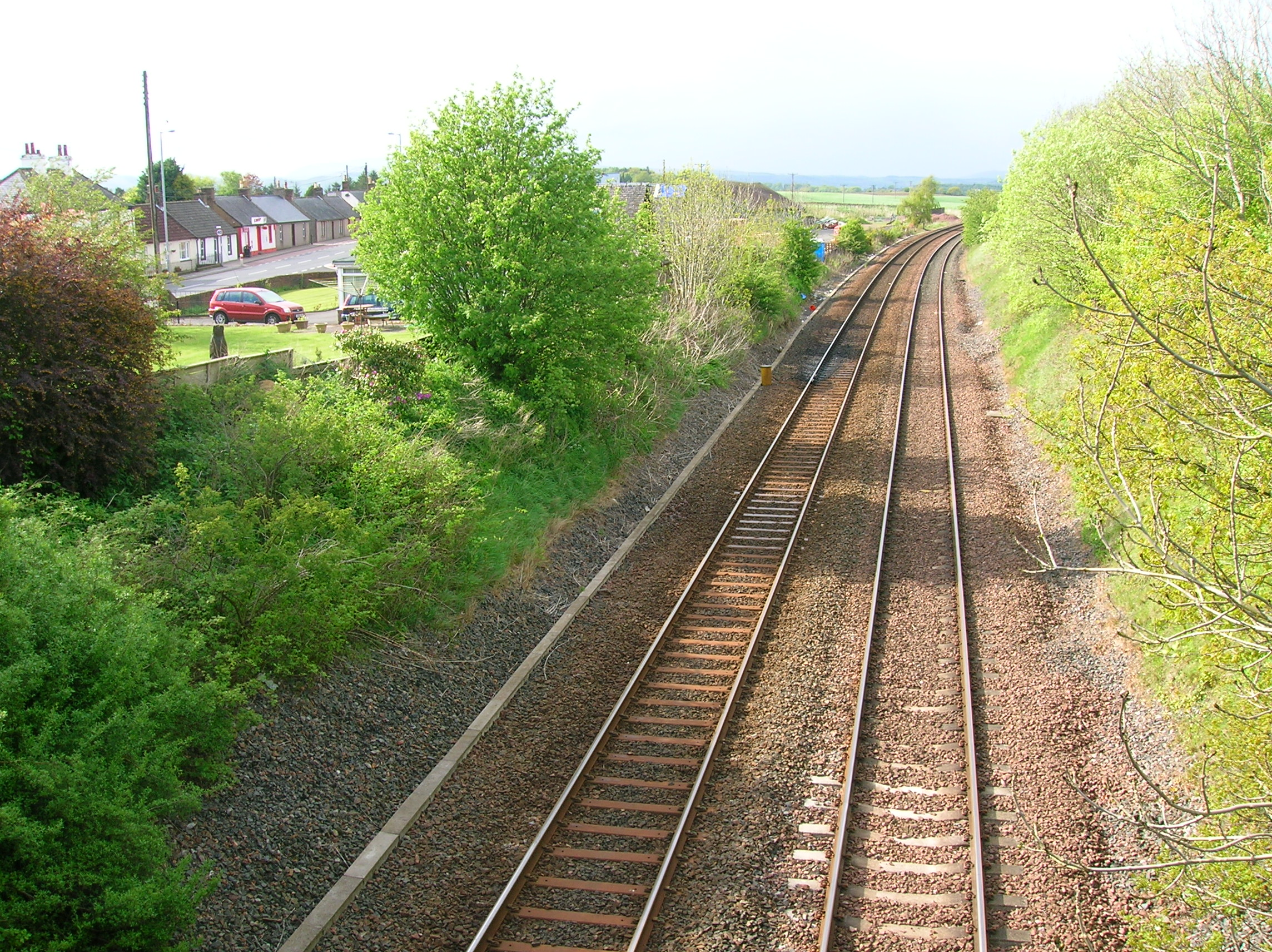

General information
- Location: Dumfries and Galloway; Scotland
- Platforms: 2

Other information
- Status: Disused

History
- Original company: Glasgow, Dumfries and Carlisle Railway
- Pre-grouping: Glasgow and South Western Railway
- Post-grouping: LMS

Key dates
- 15 October 1849: Opened as Closeburn
- 11 September 1961: Closed to passengers
- 6 May 1964: Closed to goods traffic
Location

Closeburn railway station was a railway station in Dumfries and Galloway north of Dumfries, serving a rural community with Wallace Hall and Closeburn Castle nearby. Its OS NGR is NX 8970 9234.

== History ==
The station opened on 15 October 1849. The station is now closed, although the line running through the station is still open. The station buildings, goods sheds and station master's house still exist, but the platforms have been removed.

=== Lost and found ===
The 1897–1956 Found Items book from Closeburn has survived and is held in the Ewart Library in Dumfries. As per usual in Scotland items of waterproof clothing and umbrellas figure prominently in the list of recovered items.

| Preceding station | Historical railways | Following station |
|---|---|---|
| Thornhill; Line open; station closed | Glasgow and South Western Railway; Glasgow, Dumfries and Carlisle Railway | Auldgirth; Line open; station closed |
