= Holywood railway station (Scotland) =

Railway station in Dumfries and Galloway

Coordinates: 55.1158°N 3.6420°W

Holywood
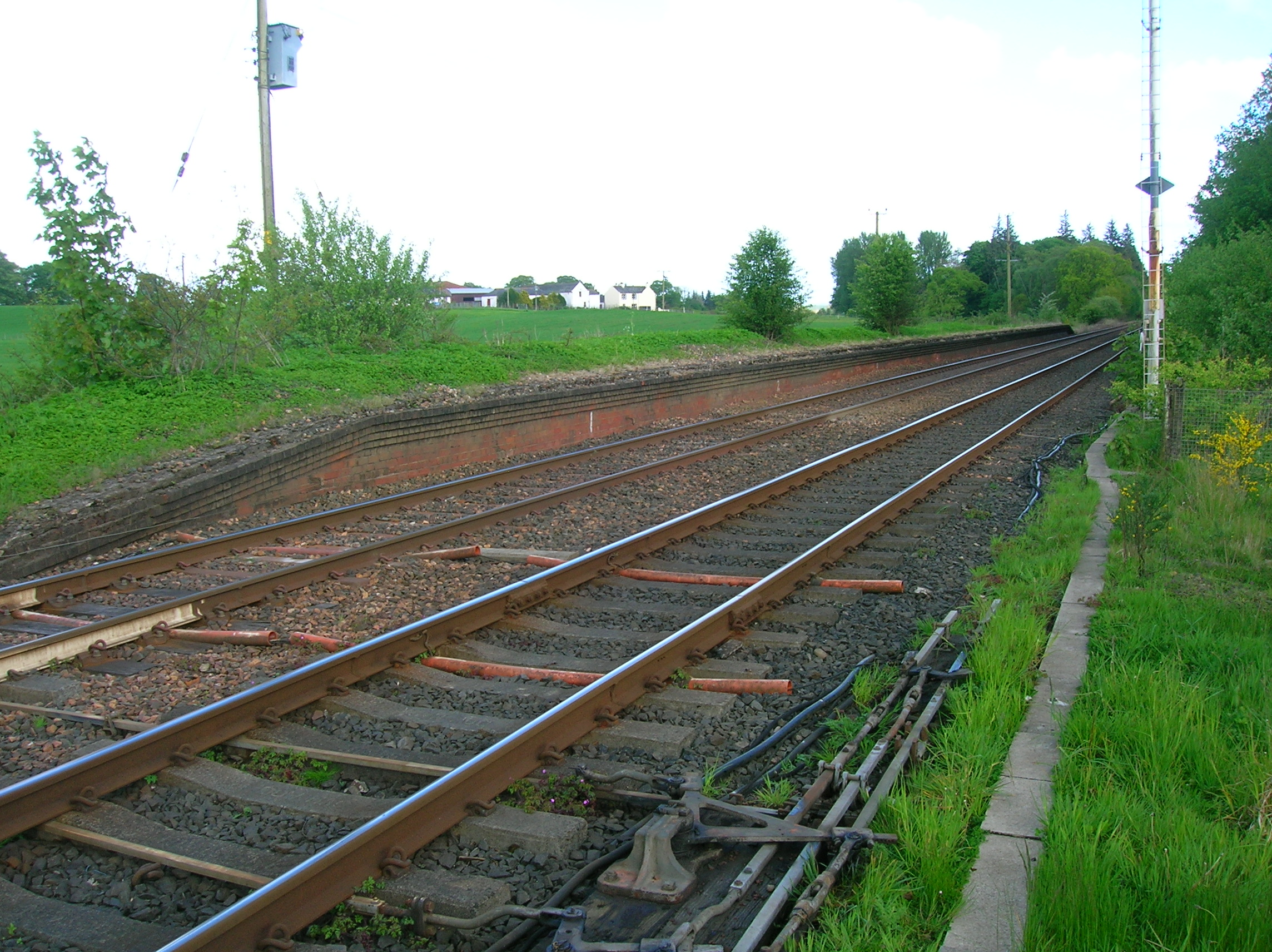

General information
- Location: Dumfries and Galloway; Scotland
- Platforms: 2

Other information
- Status: Disused

History
- Original company: Glasgow, Dumfries and Carlisle Railway
- Pre-grouping: Glasgow and South Western Railway
- Post-grouping: LMS

Key dates
- 15 October 1849: Opened as Killylung
- 28 October 1850: Renamed as Holywood
- 1920: Relocated
- 26 September 1949: Closed
Location

Holywood railway station was a railway station in Dumfries and Galloway north of Dumfries.

== History ==
The station opened on 15 October 1849 as Killylung. Within a year, on 28 October 1850, it was renamed as Holywood. The station had 2 platforms, originally to the north of the level crossing but later moved to the south of it in order for a loop to be created to the east.

The station is now closed, although the line through the station is still open. One platform still exists and a level crossing controlled by a signal box. The small village of Holywood with its church stands a little way off and the old creamery stands close by to the station site.

Preceding station	Historical railways	Following station
Auldgirth; Line open; station closed	Glasgow and South Western Railway; Glasgow, Dumfries and Carlisle Railway	Dumfries; Line and station open

== Views of Holywood signal box and level crossing ==
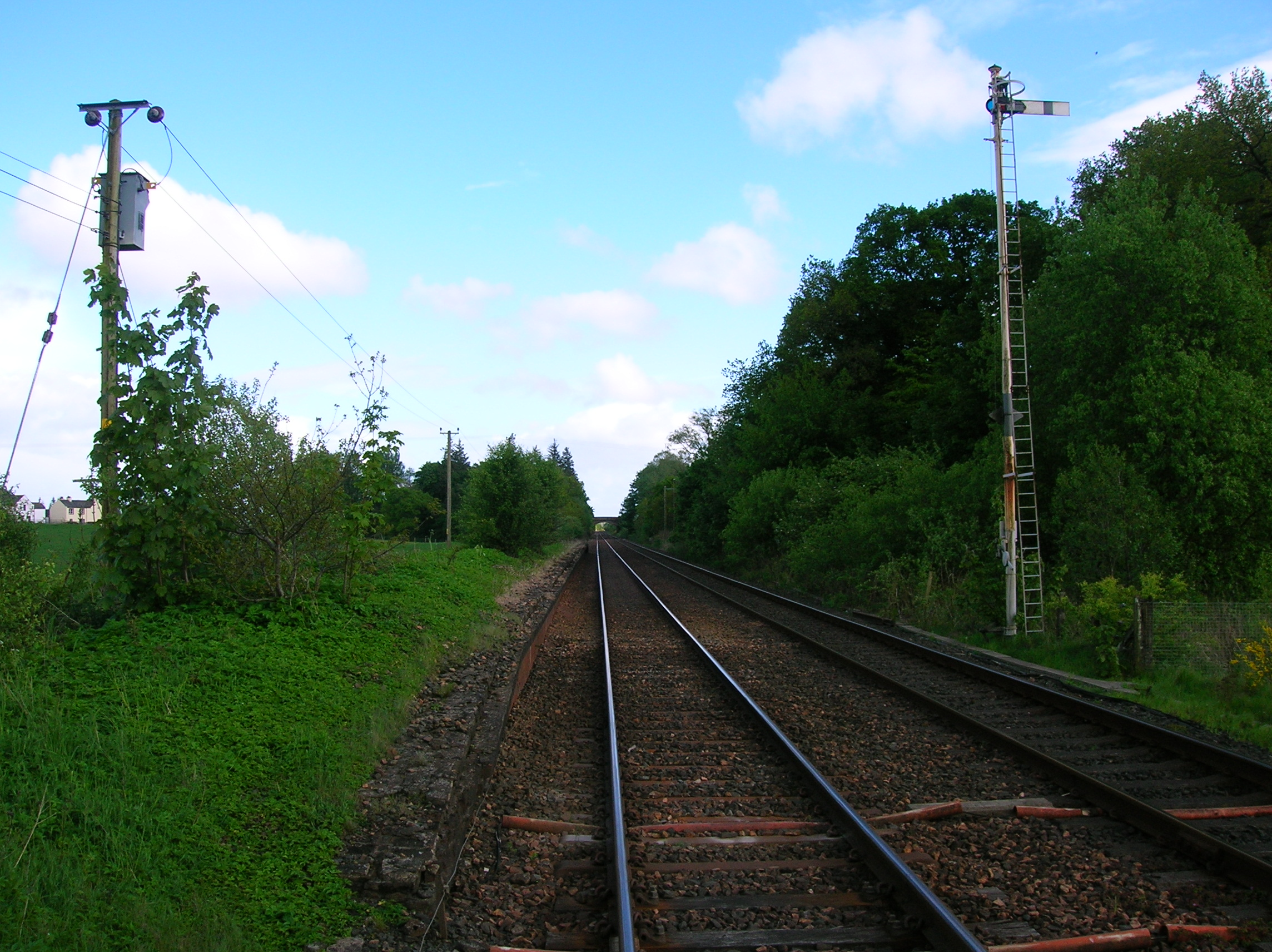
The old station platform and line looking Dumfries

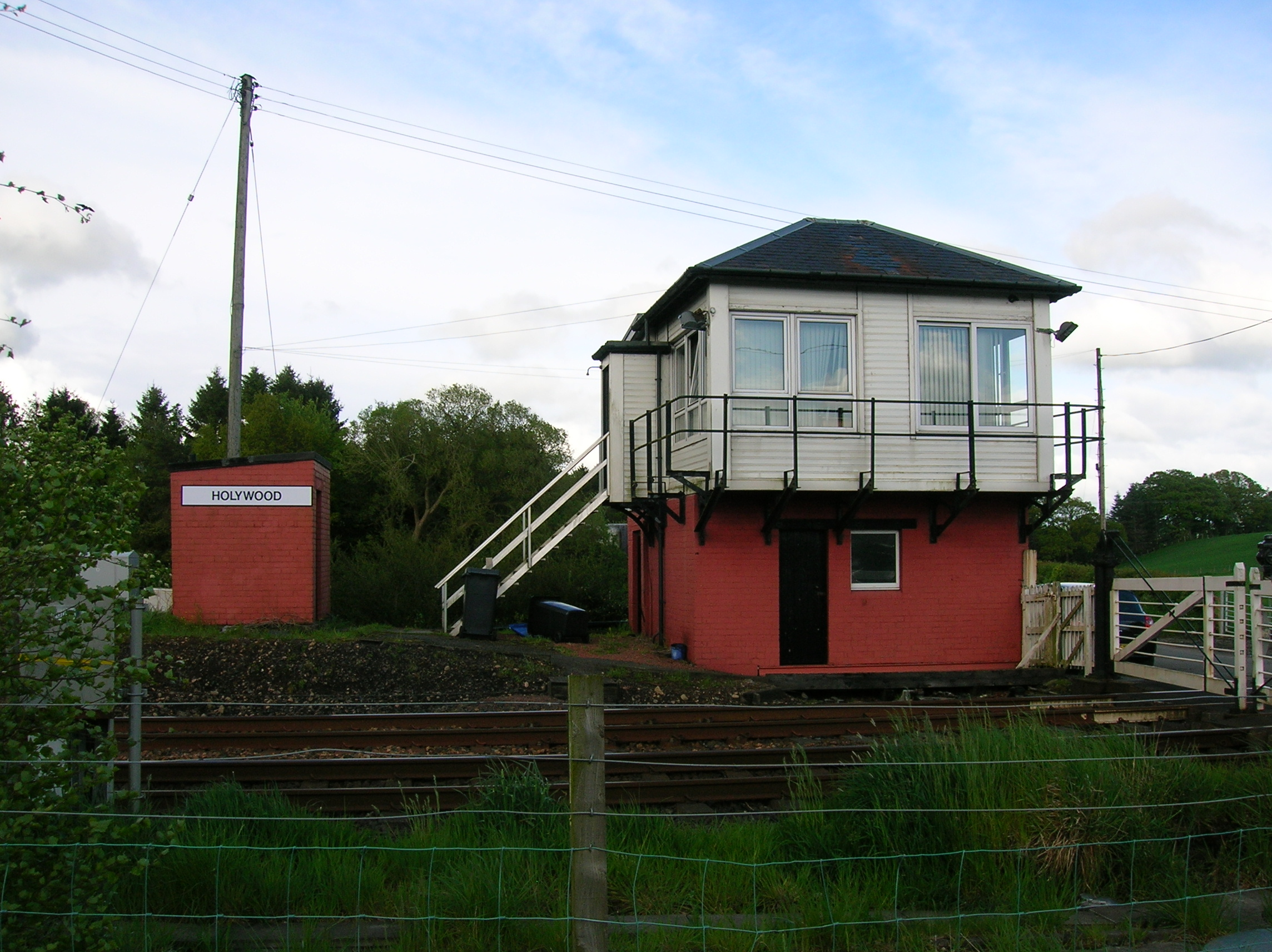
Holywood signal box

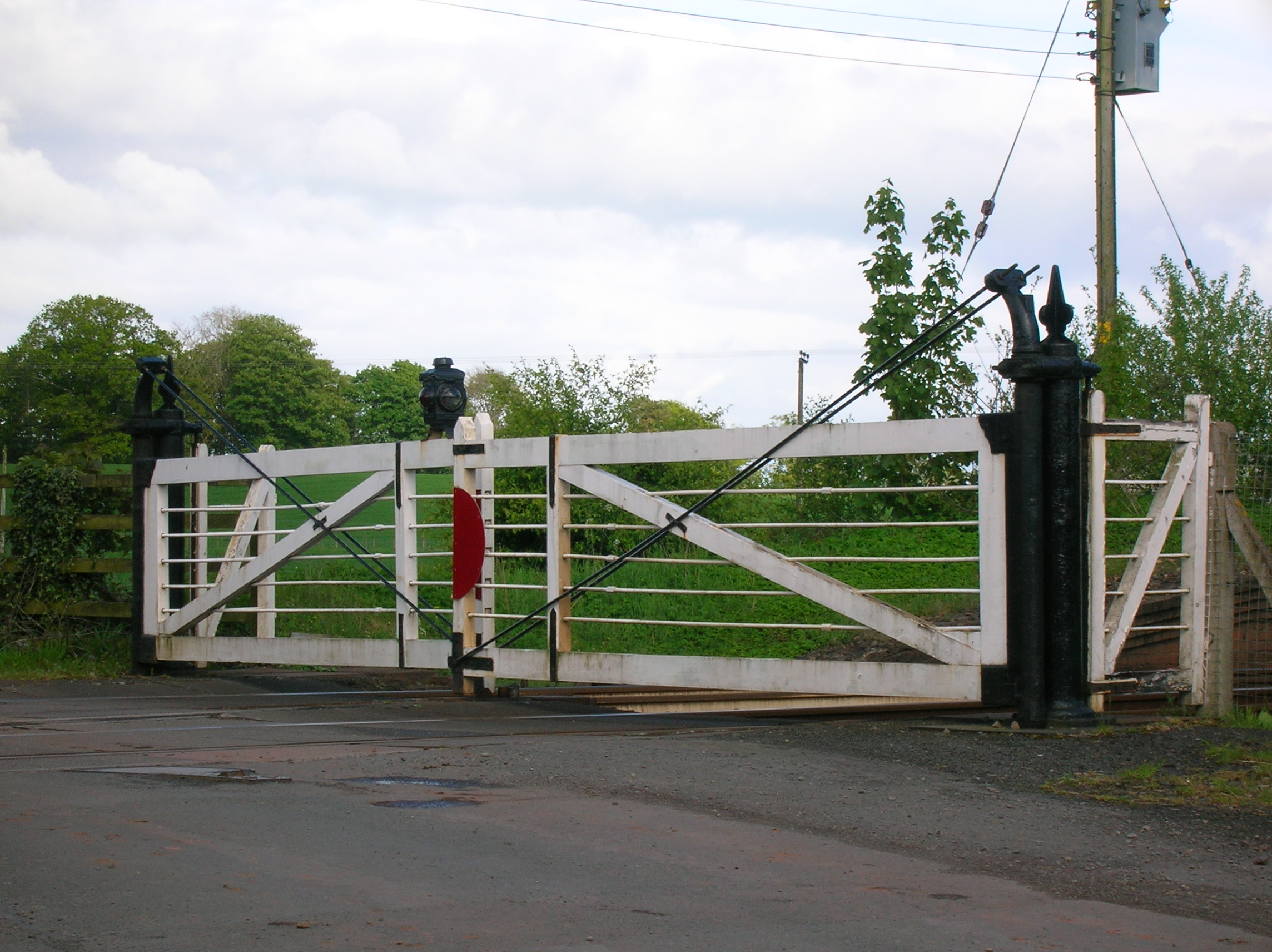
Detail of the level crossing gates

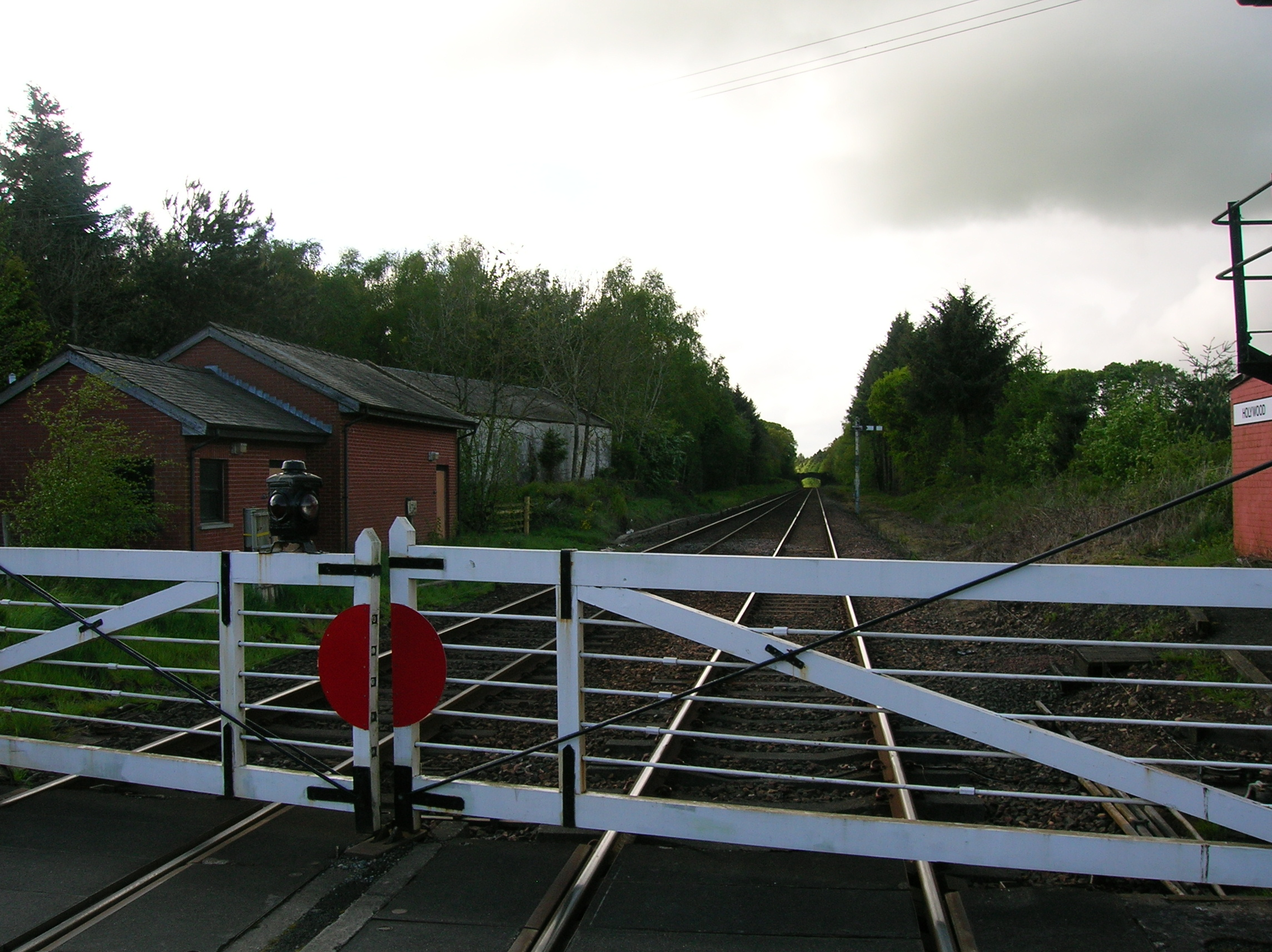
Looking towards Auldgirth
