= Sanquhar railway station =

Railway station in Dumfries and Galloway, Scotland

Sanquhar Scottish Gaelic: Seanchair
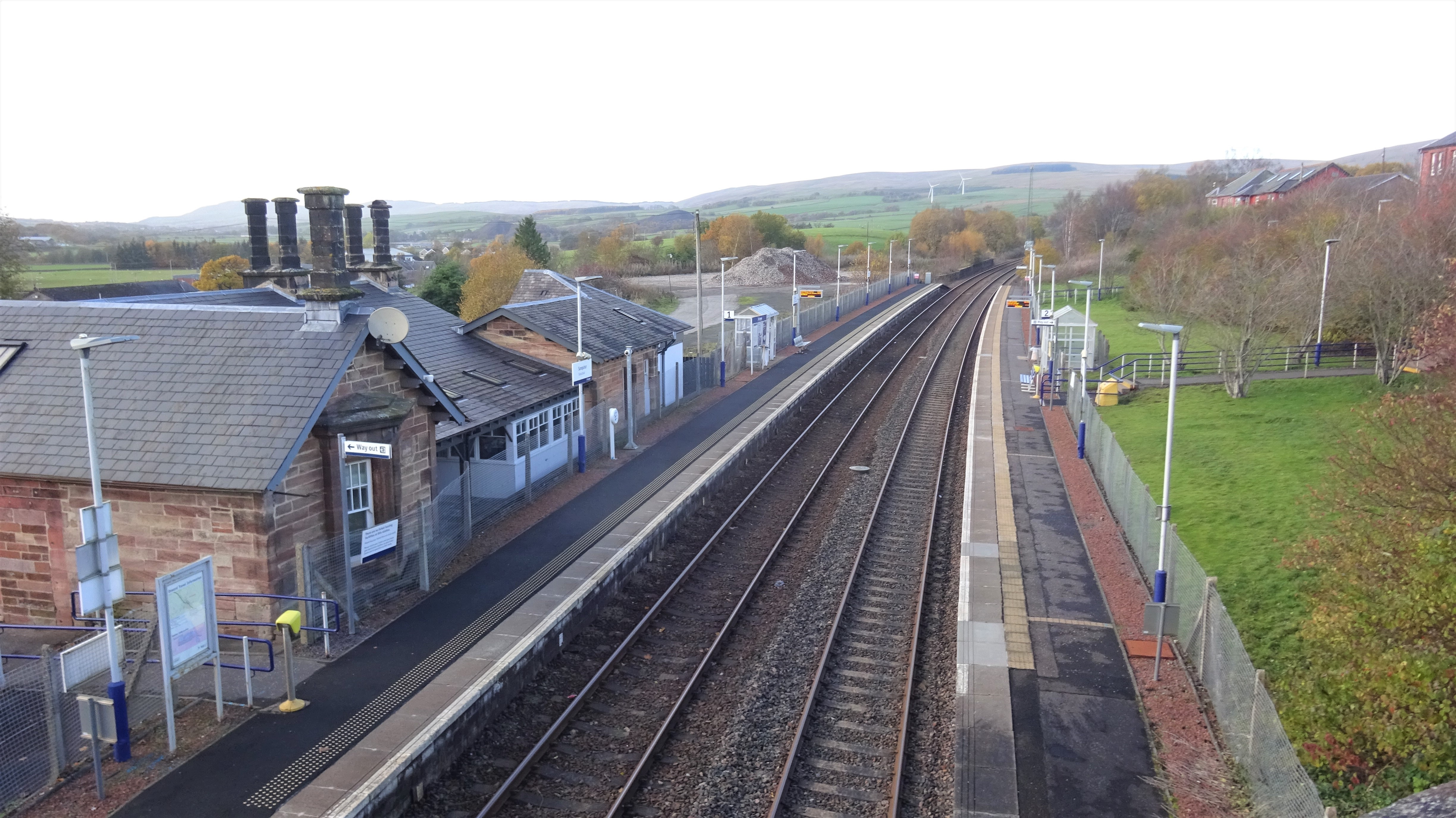
- Sanquhar station from the road bridge looking towards Kirkconnel in 2021

General information
- Location: Sanquhar, Dumfries and Galloway; Scotland
- Coordinates: 55.3710°N 3.9248°W
- Grid reference: NS780102
- Manager: ScotRail
- Platforms: 2

Other information
- Station code: SQH

Key dates
- 28 October 1850: Opened
- 6 December 1965: Closed
- 27 June 1994: Re-opened under British Rail

Passengers
- 2021/22: ▲14,430
- 2022/23: ▲17,302
- 2023/24: ▲25,440
- 2024/25: ▲26,594
- 2025/26: ▲35,766
Location
Notes
- Passenger statistics from the Office of Rail and Road

Sanquhar railway station is a railway station in the village of Sanquhar, Dumfries and Galloway, Scotland. The station is owned by Network Rail and managed by ScotRail and is on the Glasgow South Western Line. The old station buildings are in use as a holiday home. The station was re-opened (in 1994) together with Gretna Green, Auchinleck, New Cumnock, Kilmaurs and Dunlop after initially falling victim to the Beeching Axe in December 1965. Kirkconnel remained open but has also seen significant investment in its infrastructure.

== Railway Mishap 1966 ==
On Sunday 14 August 1966, the previous evening's 22:10 Glasgow Central – London Euston consisting of five seating coaches, eight sleeping cars and two parcels vans hauled by EE Type 4 locomotive No. D311 crashed into a landslide between Sanquhar and Carrondale at 00:30. The loco and first ten coaches were derailed. None of the 270 passengers and four train crew were injured.

== Services ==
On Monday to Saturdays, there are 9 trains per day in each direction towards Dumfries (6 of these continue to Carlisle) and Glasgow Central running on a mostly 2 hourly frequency, however there can be gaps up to 4 hours at certain times of the day. On Sundays, there are 2 trains per day in each direction towards Carlisle and Glasgow.

Preceding station	National Rail	Following station
Dumfries	ScotRail; Glasgow South Western Line	Kirkconnel

== Gallery ==
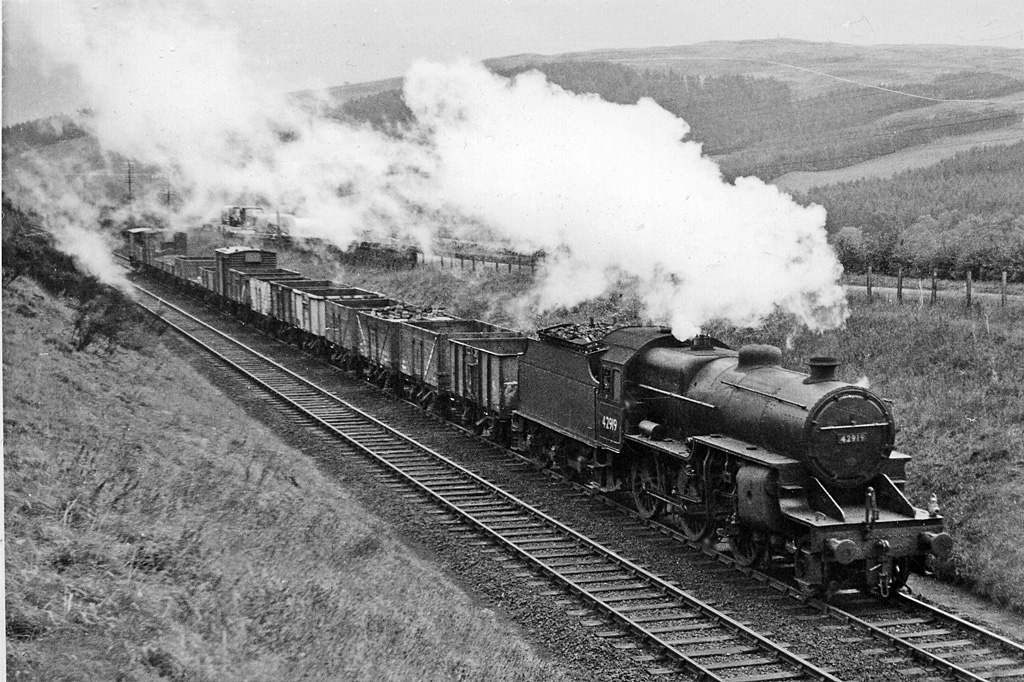
Nithsdale south of Sanquhar in 1961

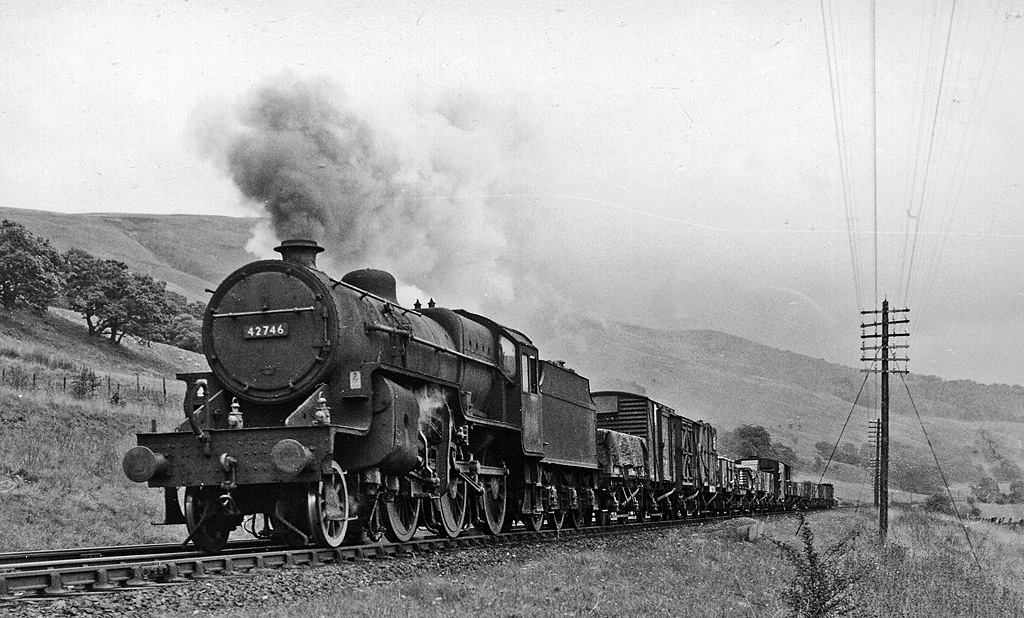
Down freight on the Nithsdale Anglo-Scottish main line in 1961

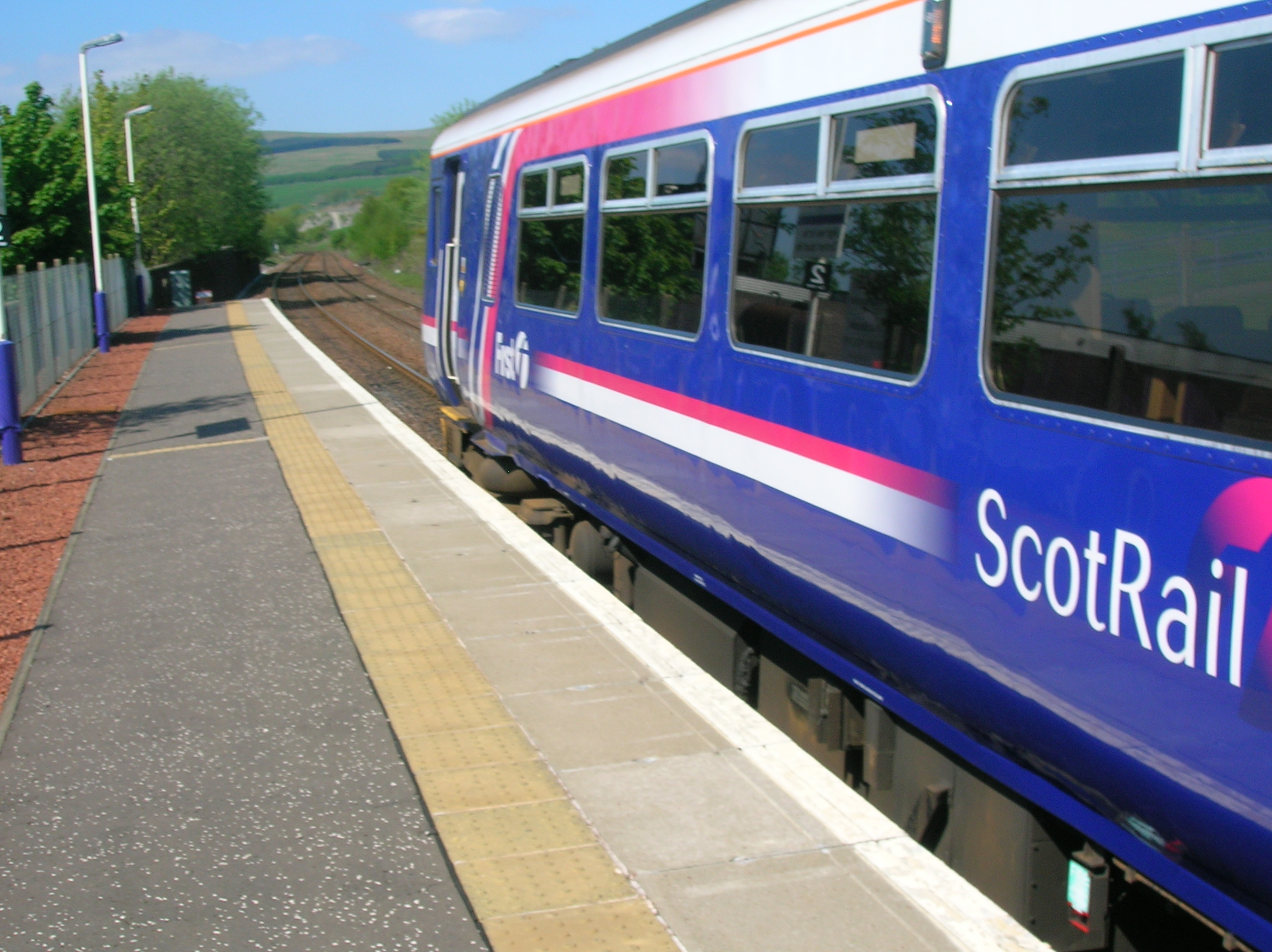
Platform 1 and a train for Kirkconnel in 2007

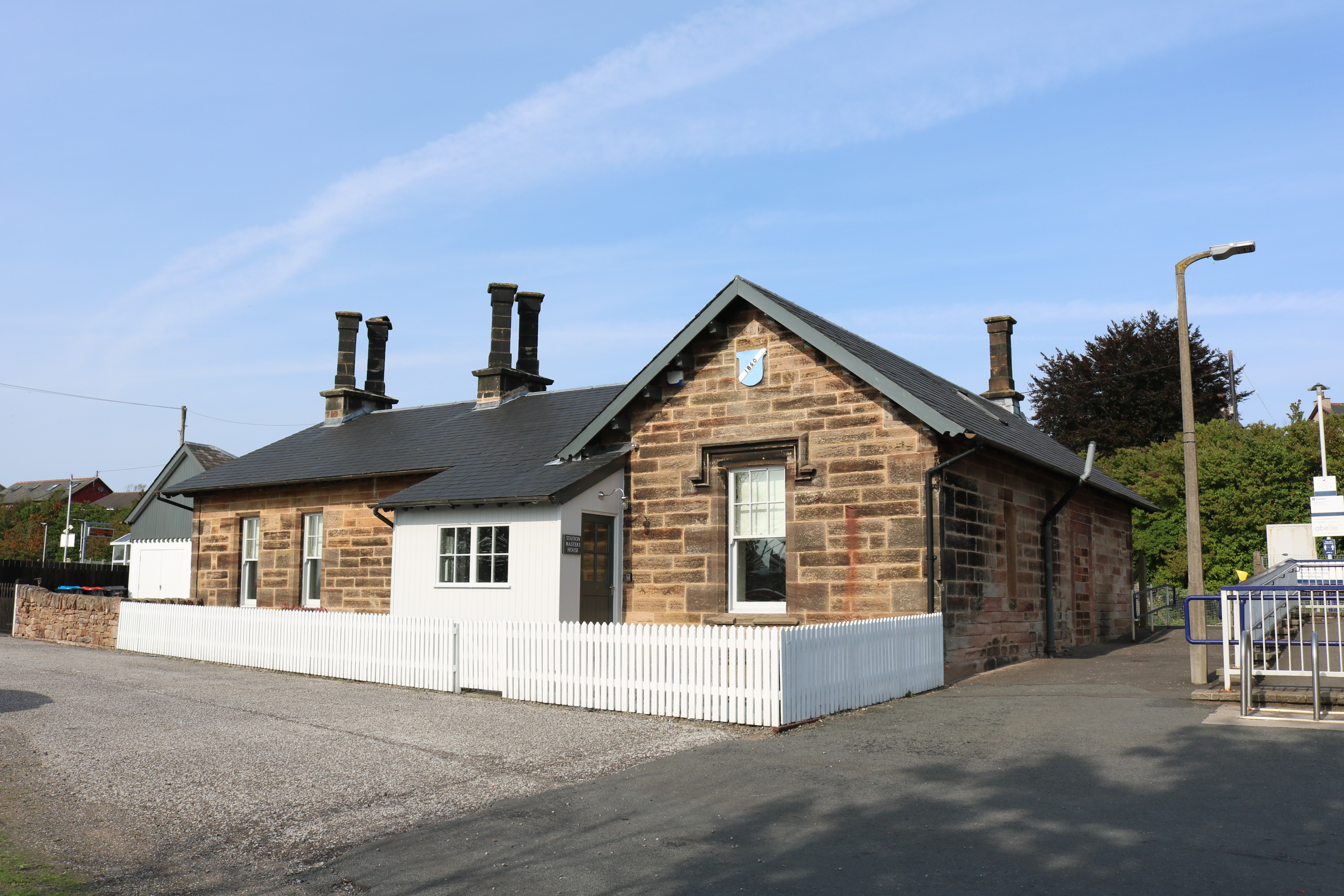
The station building in 2021

== See also ==
- Mennock Lye Goods Depot

== Sources ==
- Brailsford, Martyn, ed. (December 2017) [1987]. Railway Track Diagrams 1: Scotland & Isle of Man (6th ed.). Frome: Trackmaps. ISBN 978-0-9549866-9-8.
- Butt, R. V. J. (October 1995). The Directory of Railway Stations: details every public and private passenger station, halt, platform and stopping place, past and present (1st ed.). Sparkford: Patrick Stephens Ltd. ISBN 978-1-85260-508-7. OCLC 60251199. OL 11956311M.
