= Kirkconnel Tower =

Tower house in Scotland

Kirkconnel Tower was a 16th-century tower house, about 4.5 miles (7.2 km) east of Ecclefechan, Dumfries and Galloway, Scotland, south of Kirtle Water, south of Kirkconnel Church.

It is different from Kirkconnell House, near New Abbey in Kirkcudbrightshire.

== History ==
This is thought to have been the home of Helen of Kirconnel, the subject of the ballad published by Walter Scott, in Minstrelsy of the Scottish Border. It may have been a mansion of the Irving family.

== Structure ==
There is no trace of the castle nor evidence of its structure.

== See also ==
- Castles in Great Britain and Ireland
- List of castles in Scotland
