= Bill Taylor (footballer, born 1938) =

Scottish footballer

Personal information
- Date of birth: 3 June 1938 (age 88)
- Place of birth: Kirkconnel, Scotland
- Position: Goalkeeper

Youth career
- –: Cumnock

Senior career*
Years	Team	Apps	(Gls)
1957–1964	St Johnstone	178	(0)
1964–1967	Stirling Albion	62	(0)
1967	Partick Thistle	1	(0)
1967–1969	Luton Town	6	(0)
- Epping Town
- * Club domestic league appearances and goals

Bill Taylor (born 3 June 1938) is a Scottish footballer, who played for St Johnstone, Stirling Albion, Partick Thistle and Luton Town.
