= Helen of Kirkconnel =

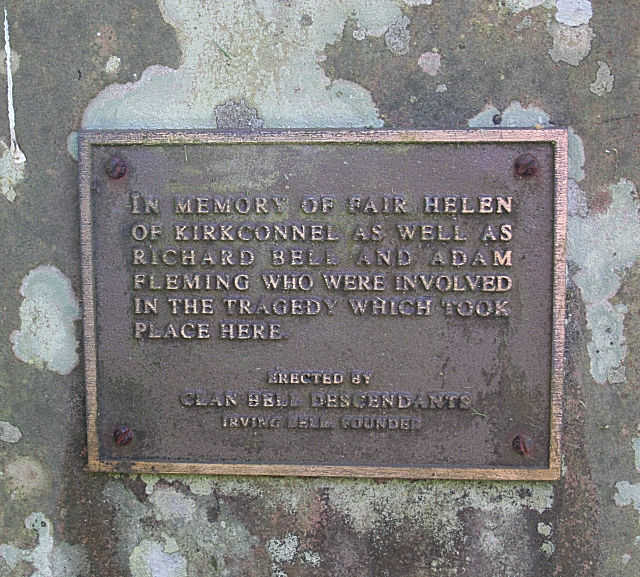
Plaque to 'Fair Helen' The plaque commemorates the participants in the story of 'Fair Helen', told in the traditional ballad 'Kirkconnel Lea' located by Kirkconnel Kirk .

"Helen of Kirkconnel" is a famous Scottish ballad.

== History ==
It was published by Walter Scott in Volume 3 of Minstrelsy of the Scottish Border. An early version was also published by John Mayne. It is also known as "Kirkconnel Lea" and "Fair Helen".

Here is one explanation of the story behind the ballad:

In the burial ground of Kirkconnell, near the Border, is the grave of Helen Irving, recognised by tradition as Fair Helen of Kirkconnell, and who is supposed to have lived in the sixteenth century. It is also the grave of her lover, Adam Fleming – a name that once predominated the district. Helen, according to the narration of Pennant (Pennant’s Tour in Scotland, 1772), “was beloved by two gentlemen at the same time. The one vowed to sacrifice the successful rival to his resentment, and watched an opportunity while the happy pair were sitting on the banks of the Kirtle, that washes these grounds. Helen perceived the desperate lover on the opposite side, and fondly thinking to save her favourite, interposed; and, receiving the wound intended for her beloved, fell and expired in his arms. He instantly avenged her death; then fled into Spain, and served for some time against the Infidels: on his return, he visited the grave of his unfortunate mistress, stretched himself on it, and expiring on the spot, was interred by her side. A cross and a sword are engraven on the tombstone, with 'HIC JACET ADAMUS FLEMING'; the only memorial of this unhappy gentleman, except an ancient ballad which records the tragical event.

— Robert Chambers, Songs of Scotland Prior to Burns

It was published by Scott as "Fair Helen of Kirconnell". Nowadays most versions of the ballad use the current spelling of the town Kirkconnel.

A popular tune to which the ballad was sung became the basis for a hymn tune, "Martyrdom", adapted by Hugh Wilson of Duntocher around 1800. A later version of Wilson's tune by Robert A. Smith is used in numerous modern hymnals.

== Text ==
This is the exact version published by Scott.

I wish I were where Helen lies!
Night and day on me she cries;
O that I were where Helen lies,
On fair Kirconnell Lea!

Curst be the heart, that thought the thought,
And curst the hand, that fired the shot,
When in my arms burd Helen dropt,
And died to succour me!

O think na ye my heart was sair,
When my love dropt down and spak nae mair!
There did she swoon wi' meikle care,
On fair Kirconnell Lea.

As I went down the water side,
None but my foe to be my guide.
None but my foe to be my guide,
On fair Kirconnell Lea.

I lighted down, my sword did draw,
I hacked him in pieces sma,
I hacked him in pieces sma,
For her sake that died for me.

O Helen fair, beyond compare!
I'll make a garland of thy hair,
Shall bind my heart for evermair,
Untill the day I die.

O that I were where Helen lies!
Night and day on me she cries;
Out of my bed she bids me rise,
Says, "haste, and come to me!"

O Helen fair! O Helen chaste!
If I were with thee I were blest,
Where thou lies low, and takes thy rest,
On fair Kirconnell Lea.

I wish my grave were growing green,
A winding sheet drawn ower my een,
And I in Helen's arms lying,
On fair Kirconnell Lea.

I wish I were where Helen lies!
Night and day on me she cries;
And I am weary of the skies,
For her sake that died for me.
