= Old Cumnock railway station =

Former railway station in Scotland

Old Cumnock

General information
- Location: Cumnock, Ayrshire; Scotland
- Coordinates: 55.4568°N 4.2515°W
- Grid reference: NS576204
- Platforms: 2

Other information
- Status: Disused

History
- Original company: Glasgow, Paisley, Kilmarnock and Ayr Railway
- Pre-grouping: Glasgow and South Western Railway
- Post-grouping: LMS

Key dates
- 20 May 1850: Opened as Old Cummock
- 10 January 1955: Renamed as Cummock
- 6 December 1965: Closed
Location

Cumnock railway station was a railway station serving the town of Cumnock, East Ayrshire, Scotland. The station was originally part of the Glasgow, Paisley, Kilmarnock and Ayr Railway. The former site of the station is now a care home. The station is located just off the A70 at Barrhill Road. This is near the Woodroad Viaduct.

== History ==
The station opened on 20 May 1850. The station was renamed to Cumnock on 10 January 1955, and closed to passengers on 6 December 1965.

== Accidents and incidents ==
- On 1 August 2015, a ballast train ran into the rear of another ballast train. Both trains were derailed.

Preceding station	Historical railways	Following station
Connection with GD&CR	Glasgow and South Western Railway; Glasgow, Paisley, Kilmarnock and Ayr Railway	Auchinleck; Line and station open
New Cumnock; Line and station open	Glasgow and South Western Railway; Glasgow, Dumfries and Carlisle Railway	Connection with GPK&AR
