= Beldina Odenyo Onassis =

Scottish-Kenyan musician (1990–2021)

- Born: Beldina Awino Nora Kungu; 30 August 1990; Kisumu, Kenya
- Died: 5 November 2021 (aged 31); Paisley, Renfrewshire, Scotland
- Other name: Heir of the Cursed
- Occupations: Musician; poet
- Years active: 2000s–2021

Beldina Odenyo Onassis (born Beldina Awino Nora Kungu; 30 August 1990 – 5 November 2021), also known as Heir of the Cursed, was a Kenyan-born Scottish musician, singer, poet and writer.

== Background ==
Onassis was born Beldina Awino Nora Kungu in Kisumu, Kenya on 30 August 1990, before moving with her family to Kirkconnel in Scotland when she was a child.She had thirteen siblings. Her obituary in the British newspaper The Times describes her as 'Kenyan-Scottish'.

== Career ==
She developed an early interest in music, and began performing at age eleven. She previously performed under the name Genesee, before adopting the stage name Beldina Odenyo Onassis (Odenyo was her mother's surname at birth, which Beldina later took as her own surname). She worked mostly in Glasgow and was named one of Scotland’s 30 most inspiring women under 30.

She worked with the National Theatre of Scotland on Lament for Sheku Bayoh and with the all-female songwriting collective Hen Hoose. She worked on several theatre projects and was developing a play shortly before she died, which she said was to be "about our relationship with the dead". Sarah Moorhouse, her biographer for the Dictionary of National Biography, said that "death was a source of sustained fascination" in her work.

A regular performer at Celtic Connections Festival, she won the Danny Kyle award. She performed a sold-out show at Glasgow's Tron Theatre in 2018.

Onassis died by suicide at her home in Paisley on 5 November 2021, at the age of 31.

Her final performance was at the 2021 Scottish Album of the Year Award, and her posthumous album, Heir of the Cursed, was shortlisted for the 2026 Awards.

Bel, a documentary about her life directed by Louise Lockwood, was released in 2026.
