= Kirkconnel railway station =

Railway station in Dumfries and Galloway, Scotland

Kirkconnel Scottish Gaelic: Cille Chonbhaill
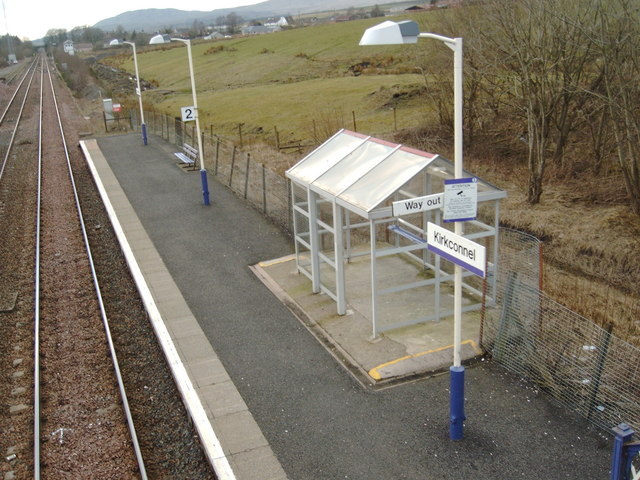
- Up (southbound) platform

General information
- Location: Kirkconnel, Dumfries and Galloway; Scotland
- Coordinates: 55.3875°N 3.9988°W
- Grid reference: NS735122
- Manager: ScotRail
- Platforms: 2

Other information
- Station code: KRK

History
- Original company: Glasgow, Paisley, Kilmarnock and Ayr Railway

Key dates
- 28 October 1850: Opened

Passengers
- 2021/22: ▲11,190
- 2022/23: ▲13,954
- 2023/24: ▲19,350
- 2024/25: ▼18,724
- 2025/26: ▲23,916
Location
Notes
- Passenger statistics from the Office of Rail and Road

Kirkconnel railway station is a railway station in the town of Kirkconnel, Dumfries and Galloway, Scotland. The station is unstaffed, owned by Network Rail and managed by ScotRail.

== History ==
Kirkconnel is situated on the former Glasgow and South Western Railway main line between Kilmarnock and Carlisle. It was one of the few stations on the route to avoid the Beeching Axe in the mid-1960s and was the only intermediate station between Kilmarnock and Dumfries for many years.

=== The railway poet ===
A plaque at the station commemorates Alexander Anderson, the poet from Kirkconnel, who rose from being a railway worker to become Chief Librarian at the University of Edinburgh. He was a surfaceman or platelayer on the Glasgow and South Western Railway, and generally wrote under the name of Surfaceman.

== Services ==
On Monday to Saturdays, there are nine trains per day in each direction towards Dumfries (six of these continue to Carlisle) and Glasgow Central running on a mostly two-hourly frequency. However, there can be gaps up to four hours at certain times of the day. On Sundays, there is a very limited service of two trains per day in each direction towards Carlisle and Glasgow.

There was previously one train a day to Newcastle on Monday to Saturdays, however this was stopped in the May 2022 timetable change.

Preceding station	National Rail	Following station
Sanquhar	ScotRail; Glasgow South Western Line	New Cumnock

== Gallery ==
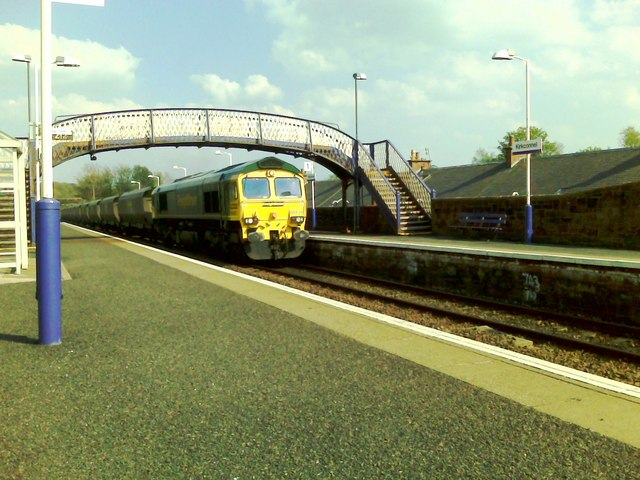
A freight train passing through Kirkconnel

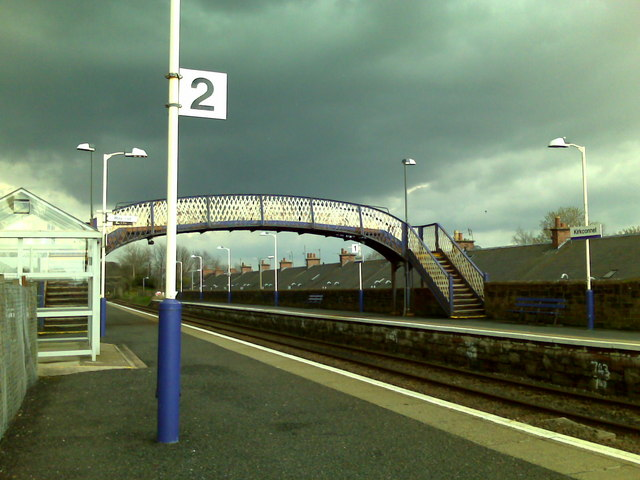

== Sources ==
- Brailsford, Martyn, ed. (December 2017) [1987]. Railway Track Diagrams 1: Scotland & Isle of Man (6th ed.). Frome: Trackmaps. ISBN 978-0-9549866-9-8.
- Butt, R. V. J. (October 1995). The Directory of Railway Stations: details every public and private passenger station, halt, platform and stopping place, past and present (1st ed.). Sparkford: Patrick Stephens Ltd. ISBN 978-1-85260-508-7. OCLC 60251199. OL 11956311M.
