= Kirkconnel =

Coordinates: 55.387009°N 4.000611°W

Kirkconnel: Scottish Gaelic: Cille Chonbhaill
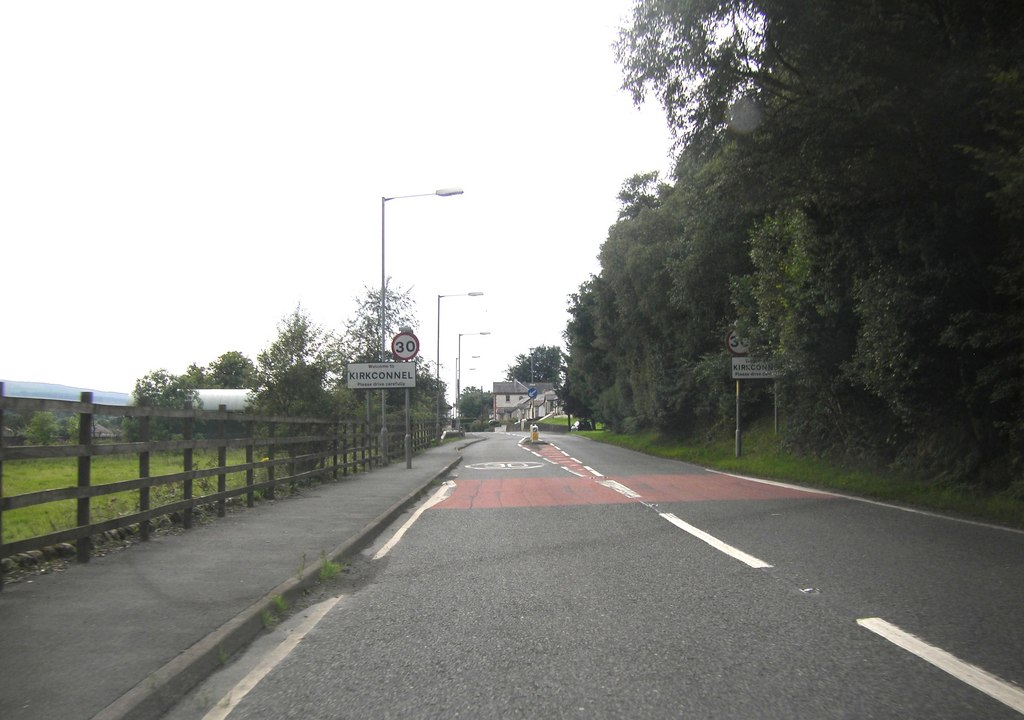
- A76 entering Kirkconnel

- Location within Dumfries and Galloway
- Population: 1,970 (2020) (Note: includes nearby Kelloholm)
- Language: English; Scots
- OS grid reference: NS7311
  - Edinburgh: 50 miles (80 km) NE
  - London: 312 miles (502 km) SSE
- Council area: Dumfries and Galloway
- Lieutenancy area: Dumfriesshire
- Country: Scotland
- Sovereign state: United Kingdom
- Post town: SANQUHAR
- Postcode district: DG4
- Dialling code: 01659
- Police: Scotland
- Fire: Scottish
- Ambulance: Scottish
- UK Parliament: Dumfriesshire, Clydesdale and Tweeddale
- Scottish Parliament: Dumfriesshire

Kirkconnel (Gaelic: Cille Chonbhaill) is a small parish in Dumfries and Galloway, southwestern Scotland. It is located on the A76 near the head of Nithsdale. Principally it was a mining community thriving until the late 1960s when the local mine, Fauldhead colliery closed. It has strong ties to football. The name comes from The Church of Saint Conal. In 1850 the village had only a single street. Next to Kirkconnel is a separate village called Kelloholm.

It is also associated with the ballad Helen of Kirkconnel.

== History ==
The early church and settlement were situated at the foot of Kirkland Hill on the drove road from Ayrshire to Lanarkshire, which followed the steep incline beside the Glenaylmer Burn. Whether Saint Conal was a Culdee monk and missionary from Gaelic Ireland or the son of a local shepherd befriended and educated by Glasgow's Saint Mungo, Christianity came early to this part of Nithsdale. A Celtic cross, erected in 1880 by the Duke of Buccleuch at the instigation of the Church of Scotland minister, the Rev. John Donaldson, marks the reputed burial place of Saint Conal. From the neighbourhood of the cross, on a clear day, can be seen the churches at Kirkconnel, Sanquhar and Kirkbride, all associated with Saint Conal.

St Conal's Church is one of the oldest church sites in Southern Scotland with archaeological remains dating to the 9th century and the present foundations of a church dating back to the 12th and 13th centuries.

Life changed dramatically for this small town in the 1890s when a coal pit was opened at Fauldheld. Coal had always been mined in the district before, but never in large quantities. From then on coal dominated the life of the little town. The coal industry moved away in recent decades, and with it much of the population.

== Transport ==
The A76 road runs through the area. Kirkconnel is served by bus routes 221 and 246.

Kirkconnel is served by Kirkconnel railway station on the Glasgow South Western Line.

== Notable people ==
- Willie Ferguson - footballer with Chelsea F.C. and Queen of the South F.C.
- Kris Haddow - playwright, poet, performer and author (born Kris Clark)
- Watson Kirkconnell - Canadian poet, playwright, and public intellectual. Visited the village, where he had familial roots, in 1953 and later composed a poem about local history; "Kirkconnell, Galloway, A.D. 600. Visited A.D. 1953".
- Bill Taylor - footballer with St Johnstone F.C.
- Sam Hastings - footballer with Hamilton Academicals and Clyde F.C.
- Alex Parker - footballer with Falkirk F.C., Everton F.C. and the Scotland national football team, started his career with the local club, Kello Rovers F.C.
- Beldina Odenyo Onassis - musician, singer, poet and writer.

== See also ==
- Deil's Dyke - A linear earthwork.
