= New Cumnock railway station =

Railway station in East Ayrshire, Scotland

New Cumnock Scottish Gaelic: Cumnag Nuadh
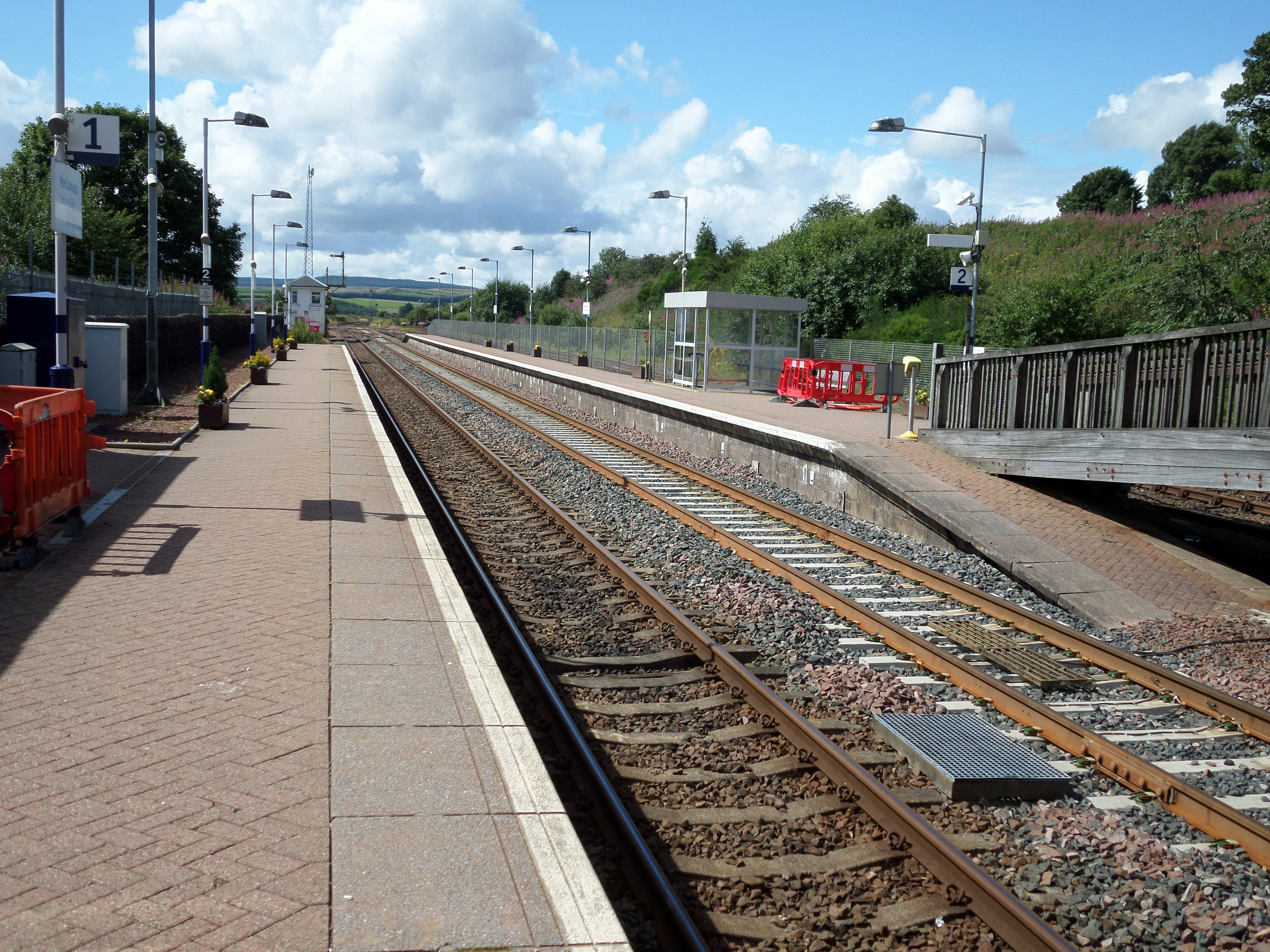
- New Cumnock railway station, looking towards Auchinleck and Kilmarnock

General information
- Location: New Cumnock, East Ayrshire; Scotland
- Coordinates: 55.4022°N 4.1832°W
- Grid reference: NS618142
- Manager: ScotRail
- Transit authority: SPT
- Platforms: 2

Other information
- Station code: NCK

History
- Original company: Glasgow, Paisley, Kilmarnock and Ayr Railway

Key dates
- 20 May 1850: Opened
- 6 December 1965: Closed
- 27 May 1991: Reopened by British Rail

Passengers
- 2021/22: ▲14,974
- 2022/23: ▲17,514
- 2023/24: ▲22,192
- 2024/25: ▲23,022
- 2025/26: ▲28,448
Location
Notes
- Passenger statistics from the Office of Rail and Road

New Cumnock railway station is a railway station serving the town of New Cumnock, East Ayrshire, Scotland. The station is managed by ScotRail and is on the Glasgow South Western Line, 45.5 miles (73.2 km) south west of Glasgow Central.

== History ==
At one time all goods trains had to stop here for inspection before proceeding. On the bleak section beyond the station the London, Midland and Scottish Railway constructed water troughs to permit longer non-stop passenger express runs to be included in the schedules of the Scottish Division. The station closed in 1965 but was reopened by British Rail in 1991.

== Services ==
As of 2023, there are eight trains per day to Glasgow Central and seven trains per day to Carlisle on Mondays to Fridays, on a mostly two-hourly frequency; however it is an uneven frequency meaning there is gaps of up to three hours at certain times of the day. Three trains per day only go as far as Dumfries. Saturday services remain mostly the same except there are only two trains that terminate at Dumfries. On Sundays a limited service of just two trains per day each way operate.

Before the May 2022 timetable change, one of the Carlisle trains extended through to Newcastle.This service was withdrawn at the aforementioned timetable change.

Preceding station	National Rail	Following station
Kirkconnel	ScotRail; Glasgow South Western Line	Auchinleck
	Historical railways	
Kirkconnel; Line and station open	Glasgow and South Western Railway; Glasgow, Dumfries and Carlisle Railway	Cumnock; Line open; station closed

== 2007 views ==
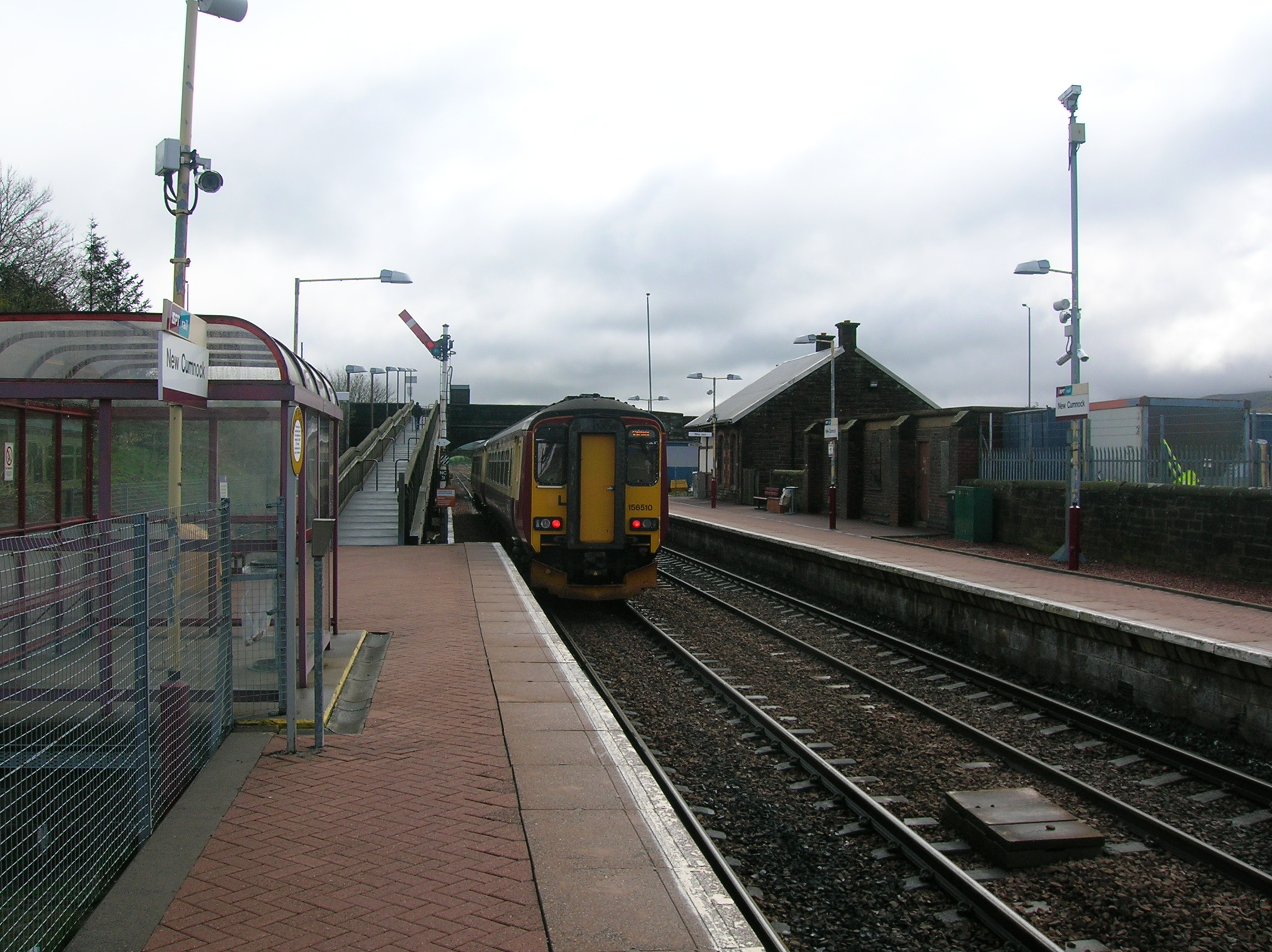
A Glasgow train departing towards Kirkconnel

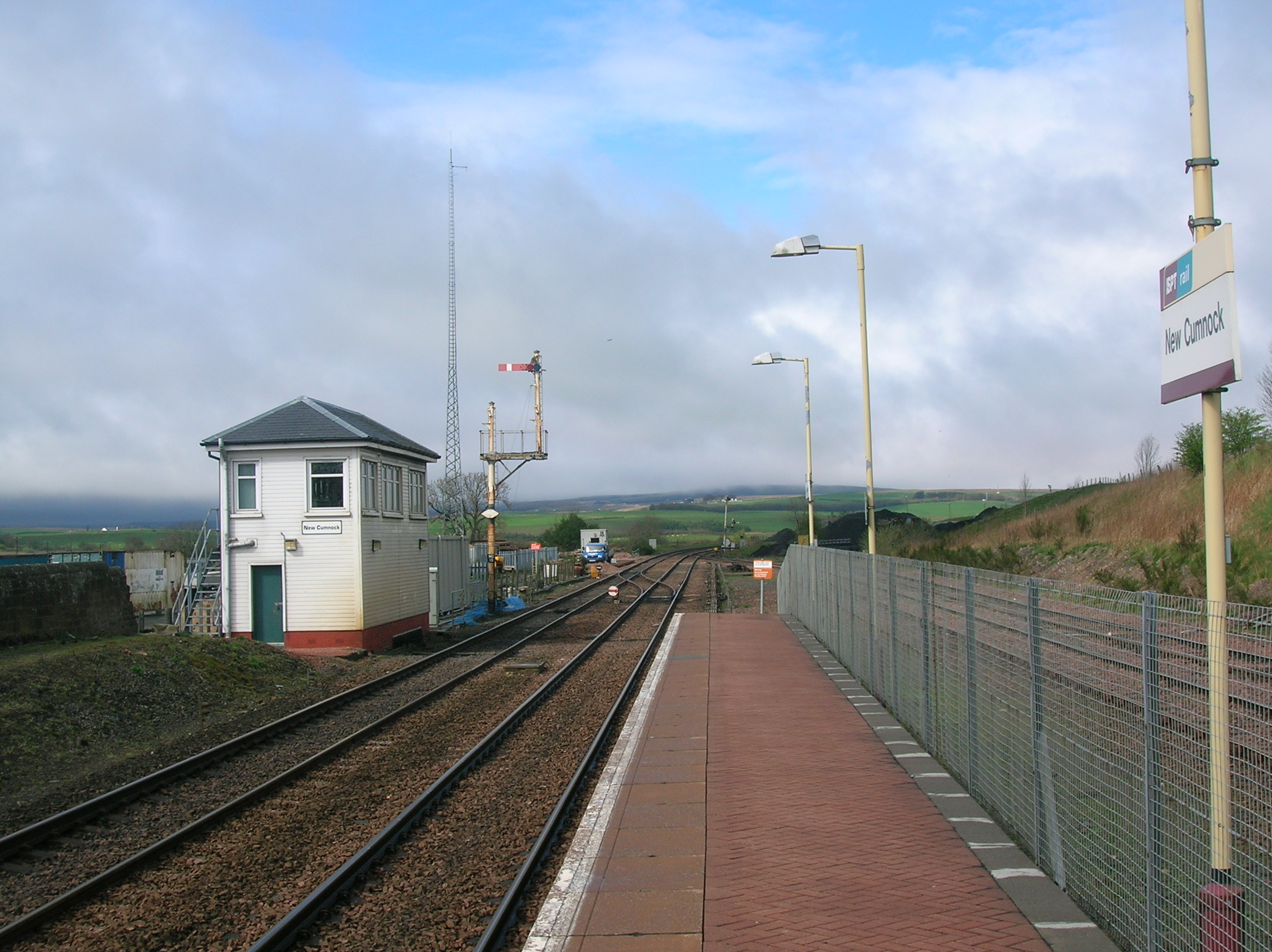
New Cumnock signal box and the coal transhipment siding on the right

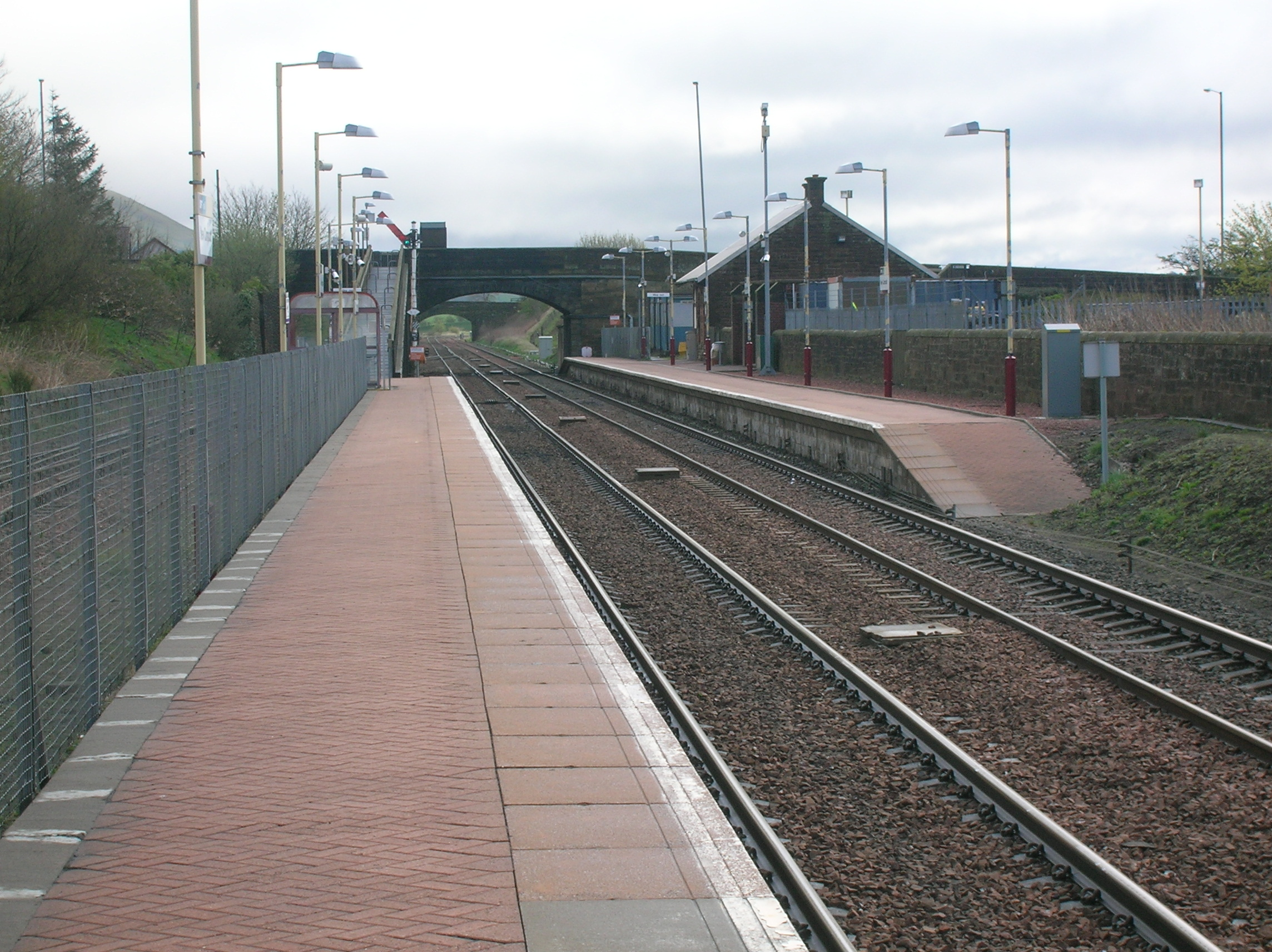
Both platforms in view and looking towards Kirkconnel

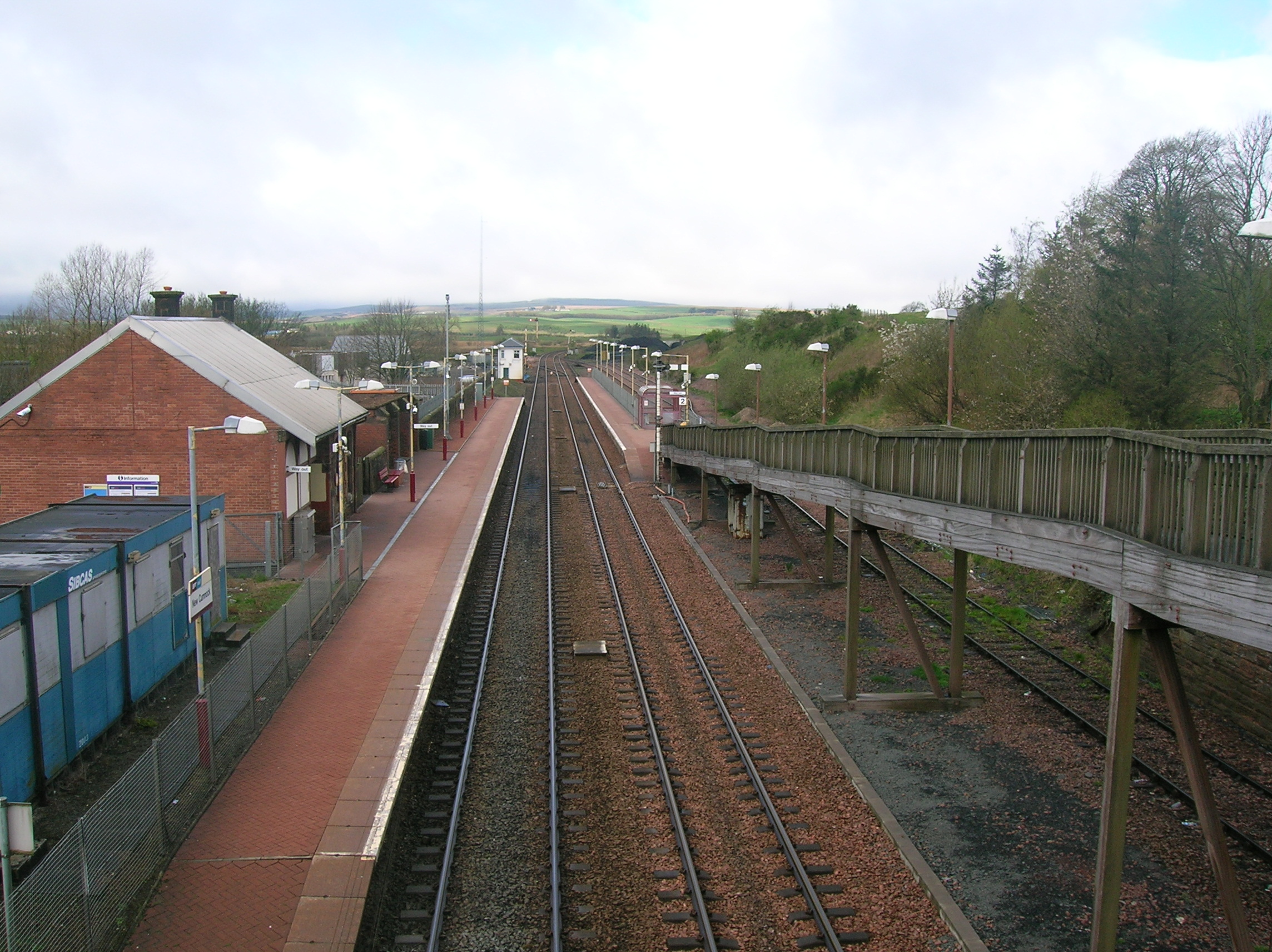
A view of the station from the overbridge, looking towards Auchinleck

== Sources ==
- Brailsford, Martyn, ed. (December 2017) [1987]. Railway Track Diagrams 1: Scotland & Isle of Man (6th ed.). Frome: Trackmaps. ISBN 978-0-9549866-9-8.
- Butt, R. V. J. (October 1995). The Directory of Railway Stations: details every public and private passenger station, halt, platform and stopping place, past and present (1st ed.). Sparkford: Patrick Stephens Ltd. ISBN 978-1-85260-508-7. OCLC 60251199. OL 11956311M.
