= Glasgow South Western Line =

Railway line in the UK

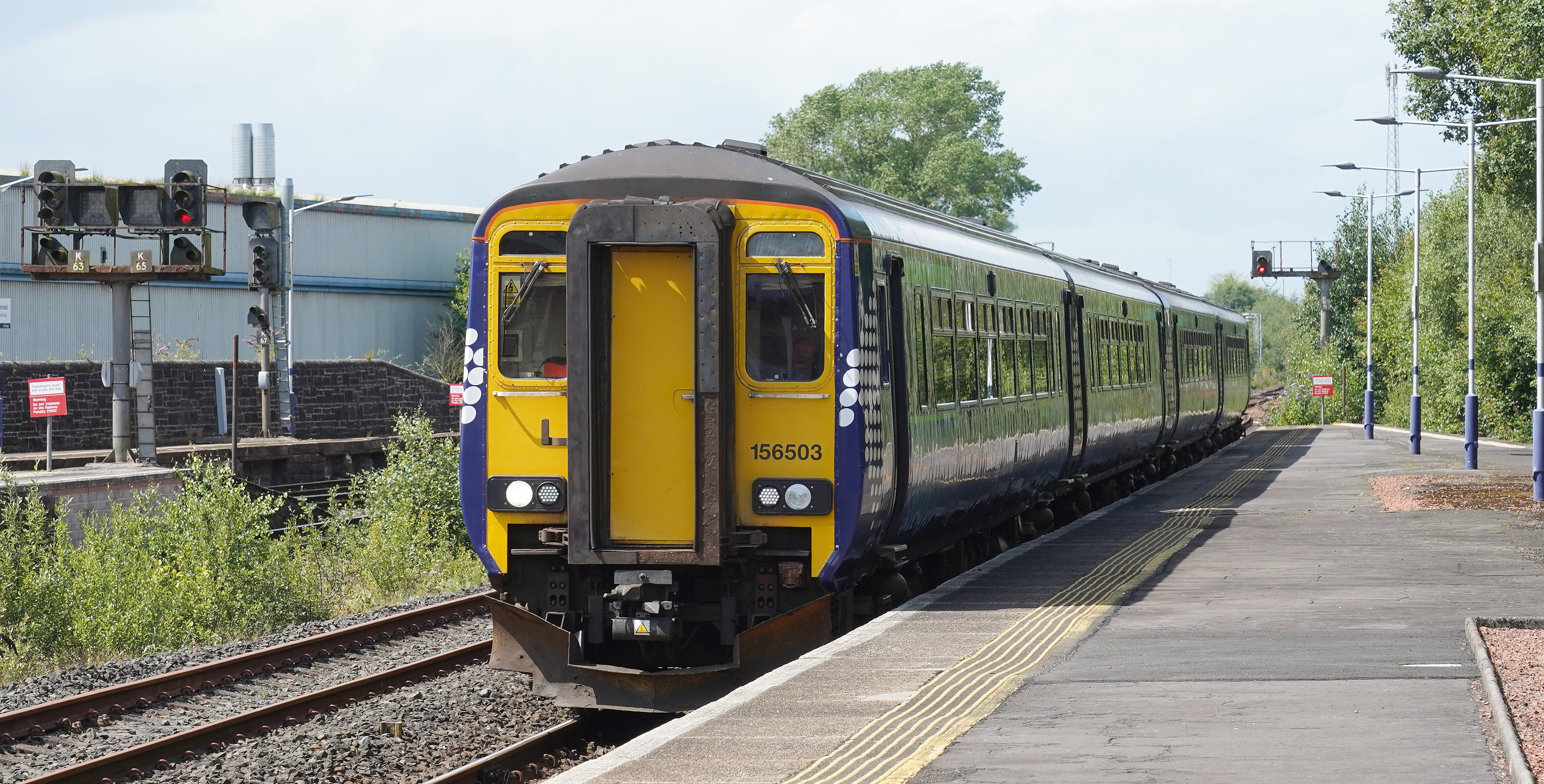
- A Class 156 arriving at Kilmarnock

Overview
- Status: Operational
- Owner: Network Rail
- Locale: Scotland; North West England
- Termini: Glasgow Central; Carlisle Stranraer East Kilbride
- Stations: 26

Service
- Type: Heavy rail, Rural Rail
- System: National Rail
- Operator: ScotRail
- Rolling stock: Class 156 Super Sprinter; Class 380 Desiro (Glasgow to Barrhead/East Kilbride only)

Technical
- Number of tracks: Double track from Glasgow Central to Barrhead and Crosby, Lugton to Stewarton, Kilmarnock to Carlisle and Troon to Dalrymple Junction, Single line with Passing loops from Crosby to East Kilbride, Barrhead to Lugton, Stewarton to Kilmarnock, Kilmarnock to Troon and Dalrymple Junction to Stranraer.
- Track gauge: 4 ft 8 1/2 in (1,435 mm)
- Operating speed: 80 mph (129 km/h) maximum
Route map
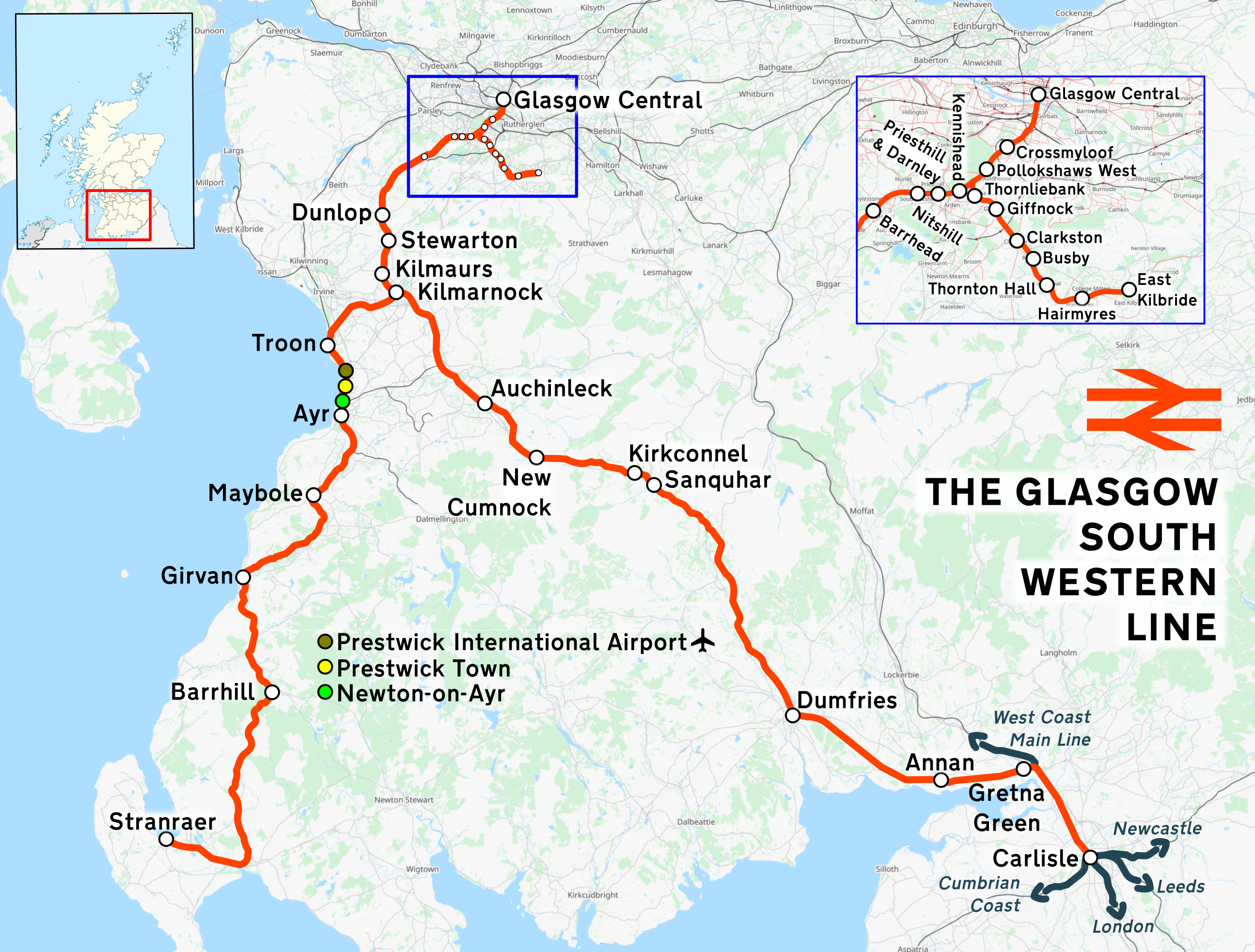
(Click to expand)

The Glasgow South Western Line is a mainline railway almost entirely in Scotland (the only exception being the final section into Carlisle in North West England) that runs from Glasgow to Kilmarnock, and then either Carlisle via Dumfries, or Stranraer via Ayr, with a branch to East Kilbride.

== History ==
The line was built by several railway companies during the 19th century.

- 1812 – Kilmarnock to Barassie by the Kilmarnock and Troon Railway.
- 1839 – Barassie to Ayr (Falkland Junction) by the Glasgow, Paisley, Kilmarnock and Ayr Railway.
- 1848 – Strathbungo to Neilston by the Glasgow, Barrhead and Neilston Direct Railway.
- 1848 – Kilmarnock to Cumnock opened by the Glasgow, Paisley, Kilmarnock and Ayr Railway.
- 1848 – Gretna Junction to Carlisle by the Caledonian Railway.
- 1850 – Cumnock to Gretna Junction opened by the Glasgow, Dumfries and Carlisle Railway.
- 1856 – Ayr (Falkland Junction) to Maybole (Dalrymple) Junction by the Ayr and Dalmellington Railway.
- 1856 – Maybole (Dalrymple) Junction to Maybole by the Ayr and Maybole Junction Railway.
- 1860 – Maybole to Girvan by the Maybole and Girvan Railway.
- 1861 – Challoch to Stranraer by the Portpatrick Railway.
- 1866 – Busby Junction (near Pollowshaws West) to Busby by the Busby Railway.
- 1868 – Busby to East Kilbride by the Caledonian Railway (East Kilbride–Glasgow Central line).
- 1871 – Neilston to Kilmarnock opened by Glasgow and Kilmarnock Joint Railway, a joint undertaking by the Caledonian Railway and the Glasgow and South Western Railway.
- 1877 – Girvan to Challoch Junction by the Girvan and Portpatrick Junction Railway.

The Glasgow, Dumfries and Carlisle Railway and the Glasgow, Paisley, Kilmarnock and Ayr Railway amalgamated to form the Glasgow and South Western Railway in 1850.

The Glasgow, Barrhead and Neilston Direct Railway and Glasgow and Kilmarnock Joint Railway were amalgamated to form the Glasgow, Barrhead and Kilmarnock Joint Railway jointly operated by the Glasgow and South Western Railway and Caledonian Railway.

The lines forming the East Kilbride branch were operated by the Caledonian Railway.

Until 1923 the line via Dumfries was in competition with the North British Railway and Caledonian Railway as one of the mainlines into Scotland. With the passing of the Railways Act 1921 (Grouping Act) the line became part of the London, Midland and Scottish Railway (LMS).

In 1948, with nationalisation the line became part of the Scottish Region of British Railways. During the Beeching Axe in the 1960s many of the railway's branch lines were closed, including the direct route between Dumfries and Stranraer, via Galloway on the Portpatrick and Wigtownshire Joint Railway and Castle Douglas and Dumfries Railway, leaving the present Y-shaped railway. The former G&SWR terminus at Glasgow St Enoch was also closed in this period (in 1966), with all services rerouted into Glasgow Central.

During the electrification of the West Coast Main Line in the early 1970s by British Rail, the line was used as a major diversionary route whilst the Caledonian Railway's Annandale/Clydesdale route was closed, particularly during the weekends. Following completion of this project, the sections of line between Barrhead and Kilmarnock (with a crossing loop at Lugton) and Annan and Gretna (controlled from Carlisle) were singled. Re-doubling of the Annan to Gretna section was completed in August 2008, controlled from Dumfries Station signal box.

In early 2009, work commenced to re-double the line between Lugton and Stewarton based on the 2008 plans published by Network Rail. Completed in September 2009, this allows ScotRail to run a half-hourly service between Glasgow and Kilmarnock.

In December 2023, electrification of the first section of the line between Glasgow Central and Barrhead was completed.

In December 2025, the electrification of the East Kilbride Branch line was completed, this involved the relocation and construction of a new station at Hairmyres, and the construction of a new station building at the terminus of East Kilbride.

With the exception of the electrified sections between Glasgow Central, East Kilbride and Barrhead which are operated by Class 380 electric trains, all services on the line are operated by Class 156 diesels.

== Accidents and incidents ==
- On 27 January 2009, a corroded bridge carrying the GSW over the A735 near Stewarton collapsed, later causing a freight train to derail and catch fire.
- On 1 August 2015, a ballast train ran into the rear of another ballast train at Cumnock. Both trains were derailed.
- On 13 December 2024, the line was temporarily closed between Carlisle and Gretna after a HGV crashed off the A74(M) motorway onto the track near Gretna; the driver was arrested and charged over the incident.

== Route ==
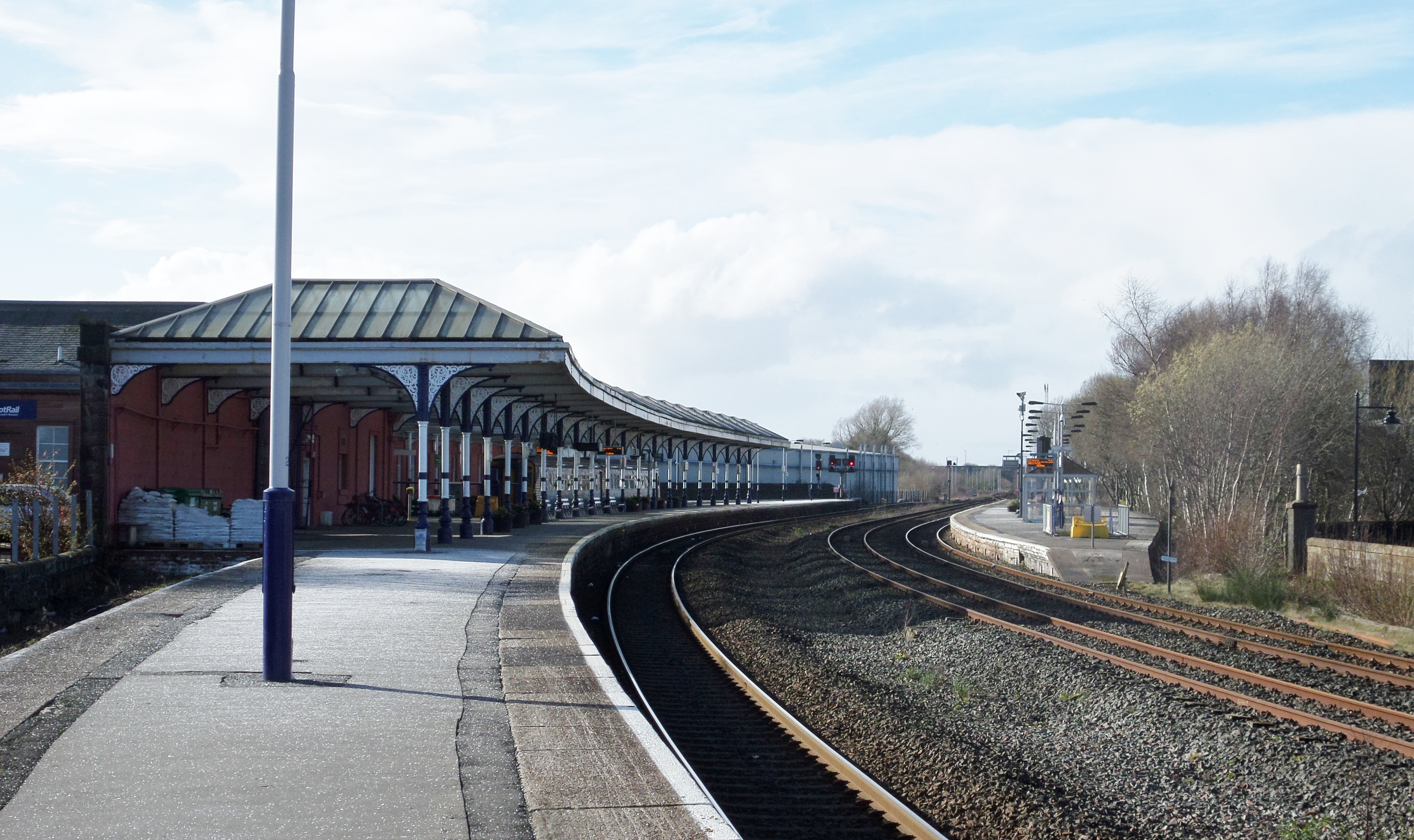
Kilmarnock

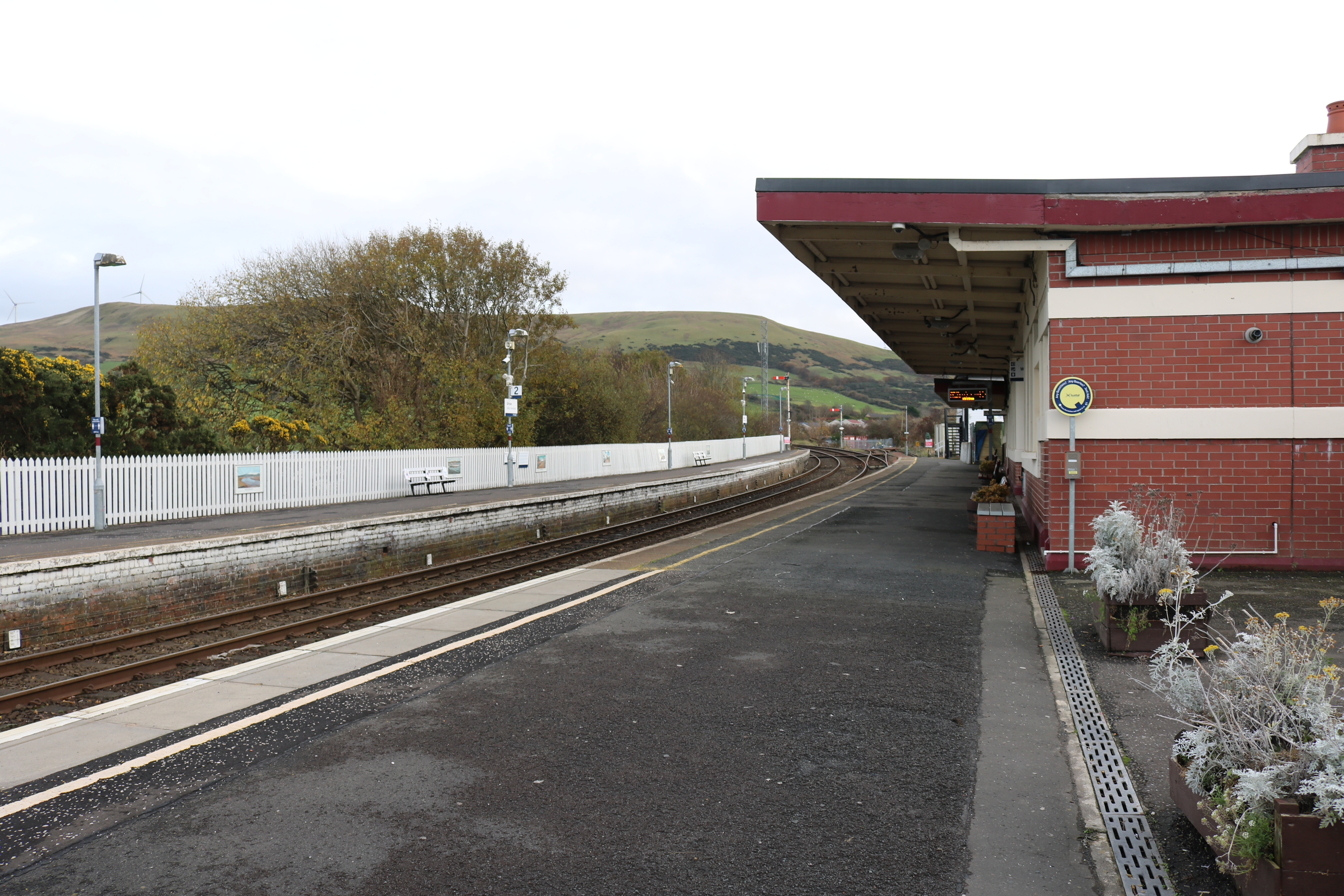
Girvan

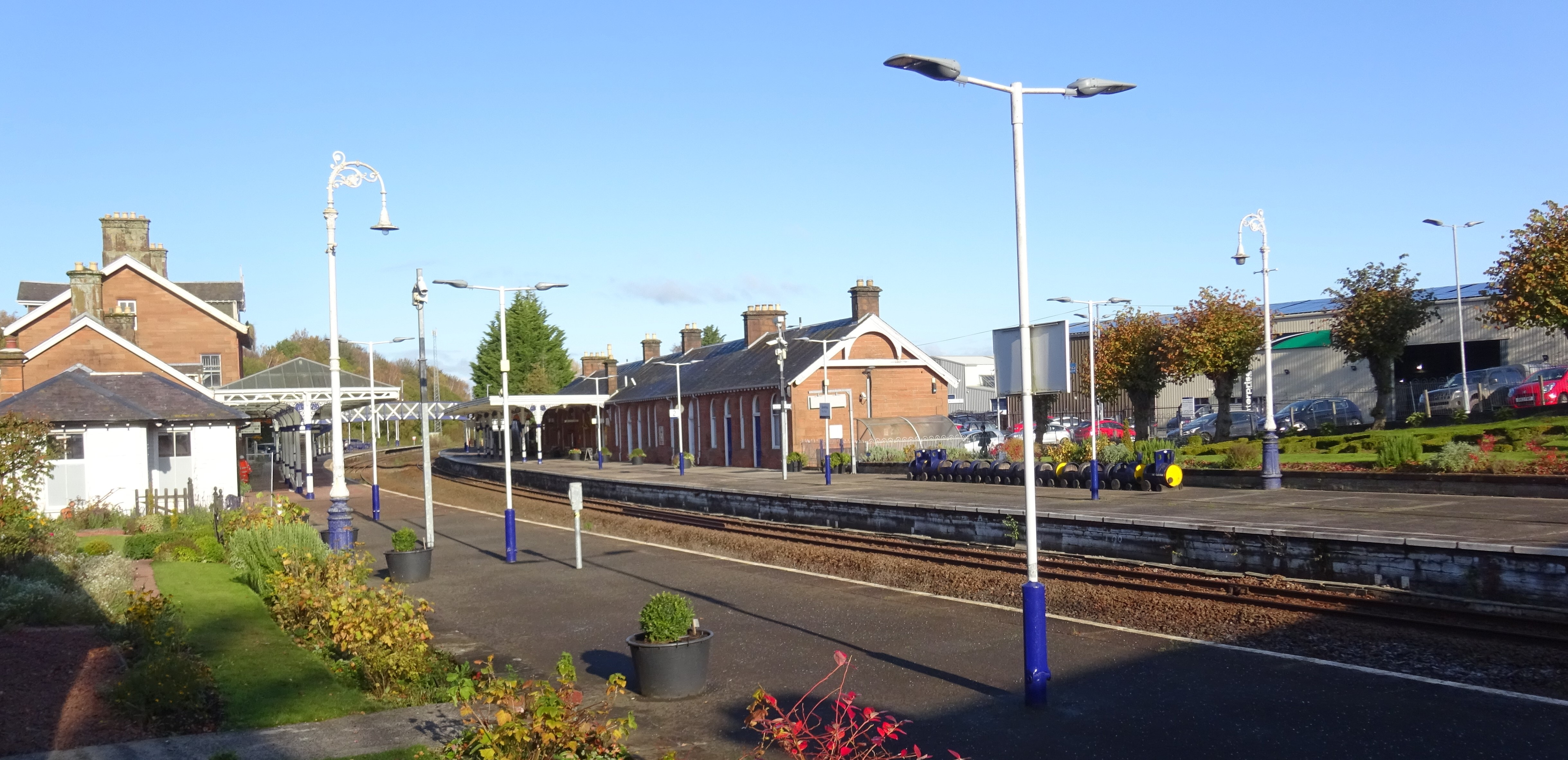
Dumfries

Trains serve the following stations.

Main Line:

- Glasgow Central
- Crossmyloof
- Pollokshaws West (East Kilbride–Glasgow Central line diverges)
- Kennishead
- Priesthill & Darnley
- Nitshill
- Barrhead
- Dunlop
- Stewarton
- Kilmaurs
- Kilmarnock (Stranraer line diverges)
- Auchinleck
- New Cumnock
- Kirkconnel
- Sanquhar
- Dumfries
- Annan
- Gretna Green
- Carlisle (line converges with the West Coast Main Line)

East Kilbride–Glasgow Central line:

- Thornliebank
- Giffnock
- Clarkston
- Busby
- Thorntonhall
- Hairmyres
- East Kilbride

Stranraer line:

- Troon
- Prestwick International Airport
- Prestwick Town
- Ayr (Coach link to Cairnryan for ferries to Belfast)
- Maybole
- Girvan
- Barrhill
- Stranraer (Bus link to Cairnryan for ferries to Larne Harbour and Belfast)

== Services ==
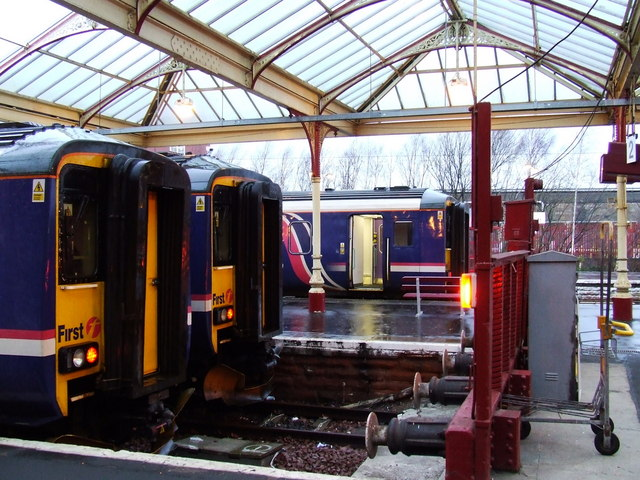
Class 156s at Kilmarnock

In the latter years of British Rail, operations were sectorised. All Scottish operations (excluding the WCML and ECML services), including this line, became part of the Regional Railways operation – being branded as ScotRail.

Following privatisation, passenger services upon the line were taken over by ScotRail, (part of National Express), and are now operated by ScotRail with the track and signalling being operated (nationally) by Network Rail. Although the Dumfries route is officially one of only three railway lines between England and the Scottish lowland areas, (The others being the East Coast Main Line and West Coast Main Line) the line joins the West Coast Main Line immediately north of the Anglo-Scottish border at Gretna Junction. Along with the Settle-Carlisle Railway, the line is much used as both a diversionary route, especially during the recent West Coast Main Line modernisation, and for freight, notably coal from the several open cast coalmines of the Ayrshire Coalfield that adjoin the line.

Between Glasgow Central, Gretna Green and Girvan the line is operated by ScotRail. Electric train services are also provided between Glasgow and Troon and Ayr via the Ayrshire Coast Line. There are also a number of through services between Glasgow & Stranraer that run direct via Paisley & Kilwinning (others run via Kilmarnock, as do certain trains to/from Girvan). From the December 2015 timetable change, new Scotrail franchisee Abellio changed the schedule on the Stranraer line—the service frequency to/from Ayr has increased from six trains each way to eight on weekdays (and from three to five on Sundays), but there are now no longer any direct trains to Glasgow via Paisley—all services now run via Kilmarnock.

In the 1970s, most of the intermediate stations between Kilmarnock and Carlisle were closed, leaving only Kirkconnel, Dumfries and Annan. Since then, the stations at New Cumnock, Auchinleck, Sanquhar and Gretna Green have been reopened. There have been several studies recently as to the possibility of reopening Thornhill station, roughly halfway between Dumfries and Sanquhar. The “Mauchline Train Station Campaign” is promoting reopening of Mauchline station, which is situated between Kilmarnock and Auchinleck in East Ayrshire. The original station was closed to passengers on 6 December 1965.

As of 2020, the line has many different service patterns depending on its lines, From Glasgow, There is 2 trains per hour to Kilmarnock(12 of these extend south of Kilmarnock with 11 to Dumfries and 9 of which continue to Carlisle while 1 only goes as far as New Cumnock while 4 (3 on Saturdays) trains per day operate to Stranraer and 1 train per day terminates at Girvan), There is a regular hourly service between Dumfries and Carlisle on Monday to Saturdays, On Sundays, An hourly service operates to Kilmarnock however only 2 trains per day operate south to Dumfries and Carlisle, 5 trains per day also operate between Dumfries and Carlisle on Sundays on a roughly 2 hourly service for most of the day, There is 2 trains per hour between Glasgow and East Kilbride 7 days a week with extra trains during peak times. There is also a regular hourly service between Ayr and Girvan with 8 trains per day extending south to Stranraer with a 2 hourly service to/from Kilmarnock, On Sundays, 5 trains per day operate from Ayr to Stranraer however there is no service to/from Kilmarnock.

Before the May 2022 timetable change, there were some services that continued past Carlisle, continuing to Newcastle along the Tyne Valley Line. The service from Stranraer to Newcastle was withdrawn in 2009. Scotrail service to Newcastle was withdrawn as part of the May 2022 timetable change (therefore leaving Carlisle as the only station in England to be served by Scotrail.)

== Rail & Sea Connections ==
The Glasgow South Western Line links into the ferries at Stranraer via the bus connecting with Cairnryan for the Stena Line ferries to the Port of Belfast and the P&O Ferries to Larne Harbour. The Stena Line ships (previously Sealink) ran from Stranraer Harbour until 2011. A bus connection to Cairnryan is also now provided from Ayr. Onward rail connections are provided by Northern Ireland Railways.

=== Former Ferries ===
The line also connected Troon to the P&O Ferries service to Larne Harbour.
