= Auchinleck railway station =

Railway station in East Ayrshire, Scotland

Auchinleck Scottish Gaelic: Achadh nan Leac
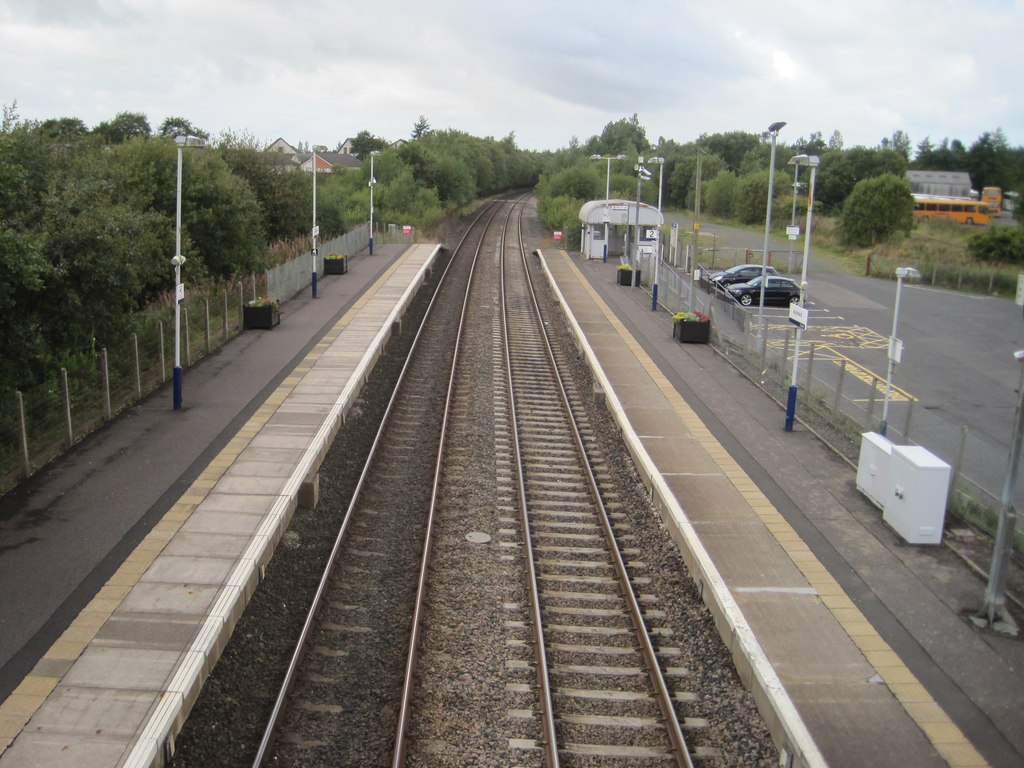

General information
- Location: Auchinleck, East Ayrshire; Scotland
- Coordinates: 55.4698°N 4.2955°W
- Grid reference: NS549219
- Manager: ScotRail
- Transit authority: SPT
- Platforms: 2

Other information
- Station code: AUK
- Fare zone: 5

Key dates
- 9 August 1848: Opened
- 6 December 1965: Closed
- 12 May 1984: Reopened by British Rail

Passengers
- 2020/21: ▼5,162
- 2021/22: ▲35,324
- 2022/23: ▲44,532
- 2023/24: ▲61,900
- 2024/25: ▲64,852
Location
Notes
- Passenger statistics from the Office of Rail and Road

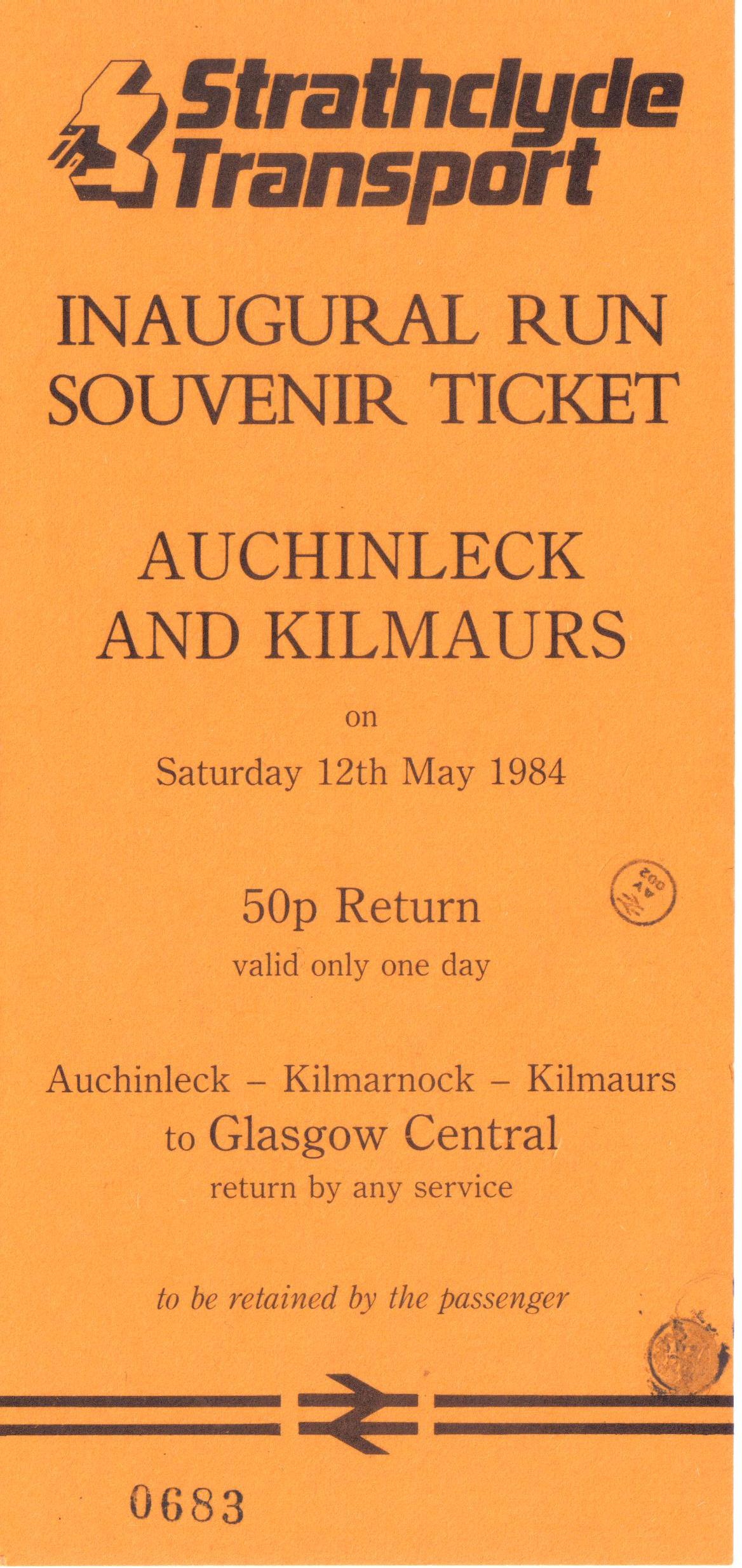
Inaugural run souvenir ticket for 12 May 1984

Auchinleck railway station is a railway station in the village of Auchinleck, East Ayrshire, Scotland. The station is managed by ScotRail and is on the Glasgow South Western Line. It is also the nearest station to the larger town of Cumnock.

== History ==
The station was opened on 9 August 1848 by the Glasgow, Paisley, Kilmarnock and Ayr Railway, then joining the Glasgow and South Western Railway it became part of the London Midland and Scottish Railway during the Grouping of 1923. Passing on to the Scottish Region of British Railways during the nationalisation of 1948, it was then closed to passengers by the British Railways Board on 6 December 1965. It was reopened on 12 May 1984.

== Facilities ==
There are now no permanent buildings here apart from waiting shelters on each platform and the pedestrian footbridge. Train running details are supplied via timetable posters, digital information screens, customer help points and automatic announcements. Step-free access is available to both platforms via ramps.

== 2023 services ==
As of 2023, there are nine trains per day to Glasgow Central and seven trains per day to Carlisle on Mondays to Fridays, on a mostly two-hourly frequency; however it is an uneven frequency meaning there is gaps of up to three hours at certain times of the day. Three trains per day only go as far as Dumfries. Saturday services are mostly the same except there are only two trains that terminate at Dumfries and only eight trains to Glasgow Central. On a Sunday, a limited service of just two trains per day each way operate.

Before the May 2022 timetable change, one of the Carlisle trains extended through to Newcastle. This service was withdrawn at the aforementioned timetable change.

Preceding station	National Rail	Following station
New Cumnock	ScotRail; Glasgow South Western Line	Kilmarnock
	Historical railways	
Cumnock; Line open; station closed	Glasgow and South Western Railway; Glasgow, Paisley, Kilmarnock and Ayr Railway	Mauchline; Line open; station closed
Commondyke; Line and station closed	Glasgow and South Western Railway; Glasgow, Paisley, Kilmarnock and Ayr Railway	Mauchline; Line open; station closed

== Views of the station ==
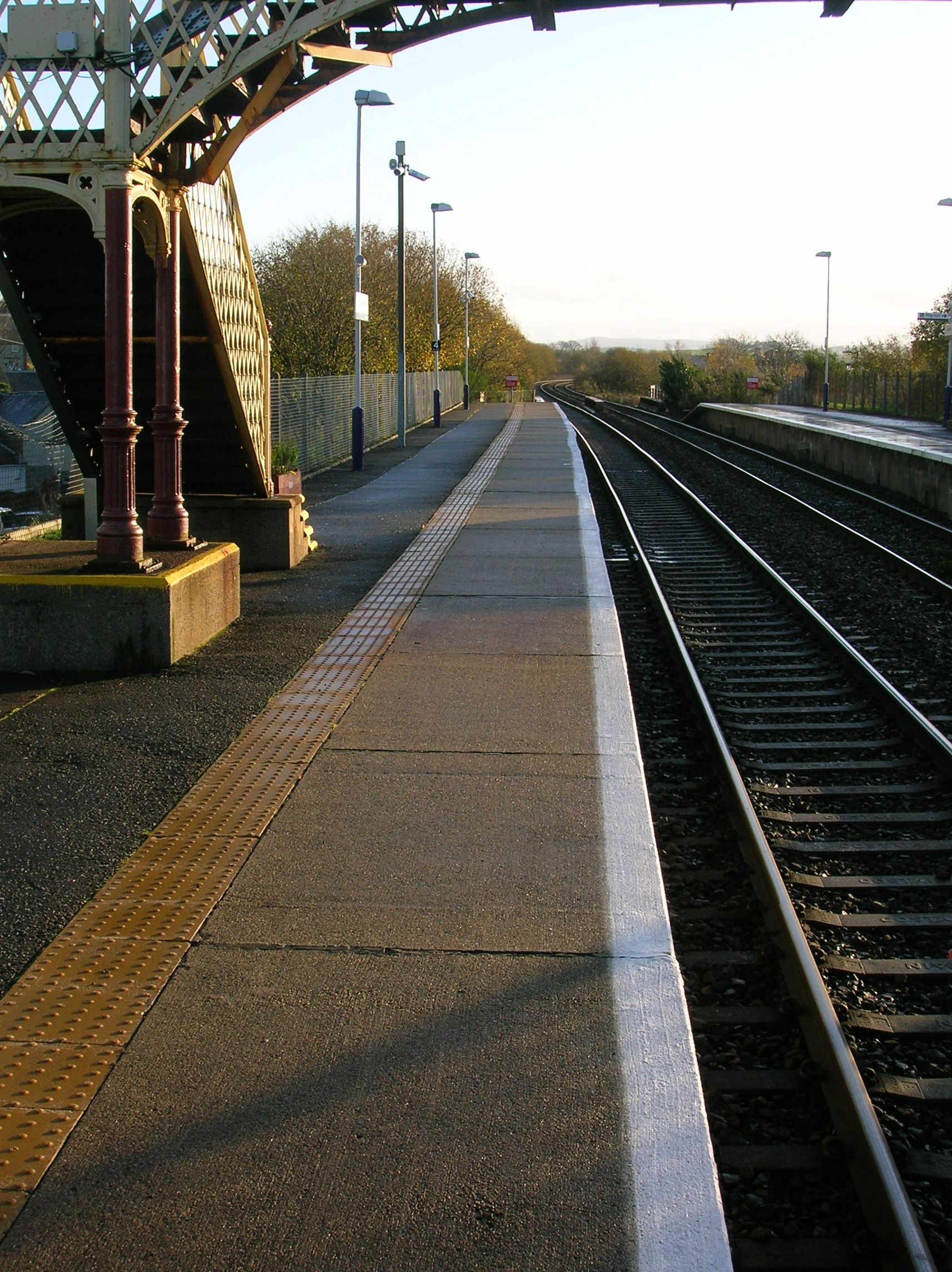
Auchinleck, looking towards New Cumnock

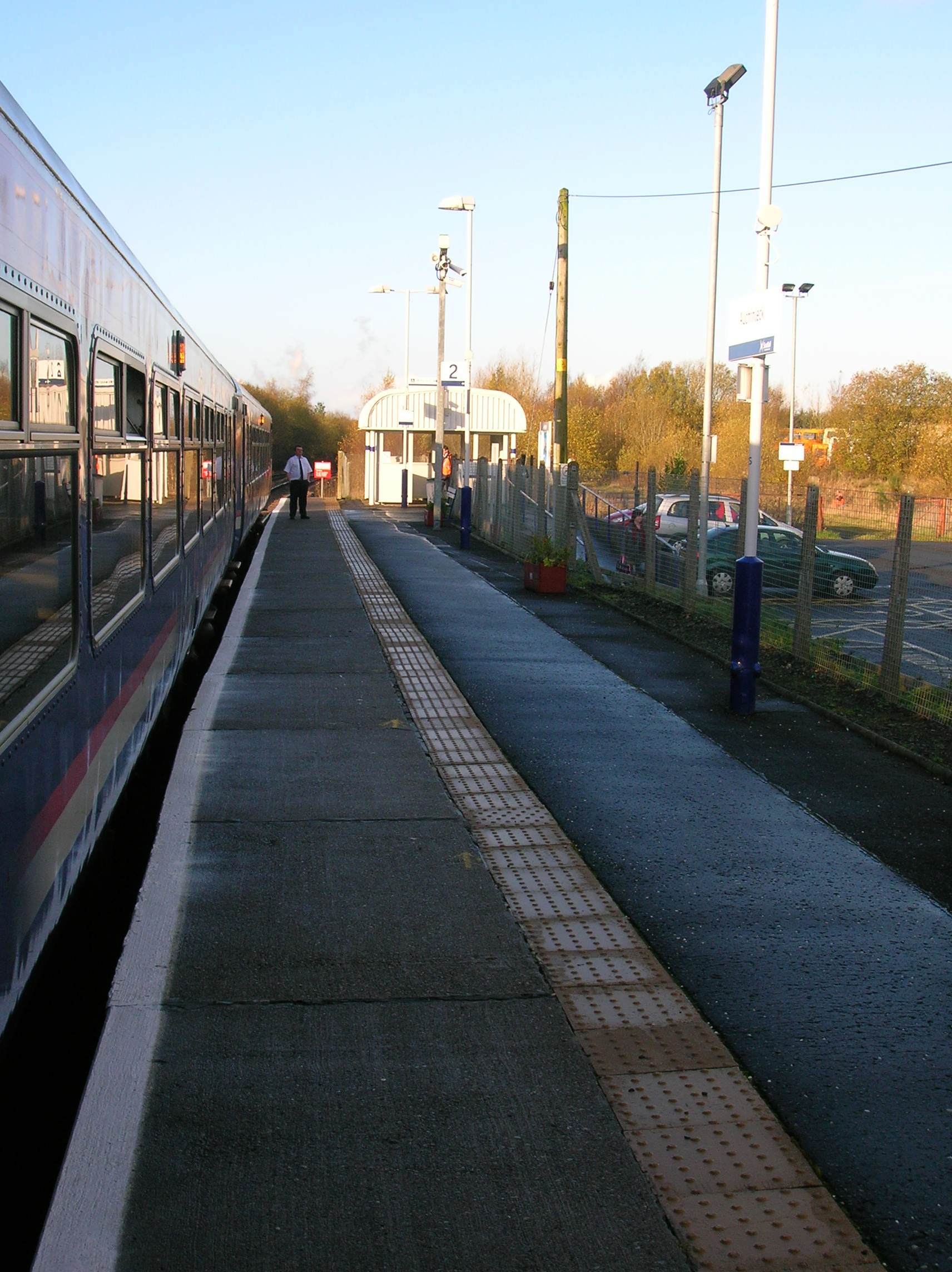
Auchinleck, looking towards Kilmarnock
