= Cholera pit =

Burial site for cholera victims

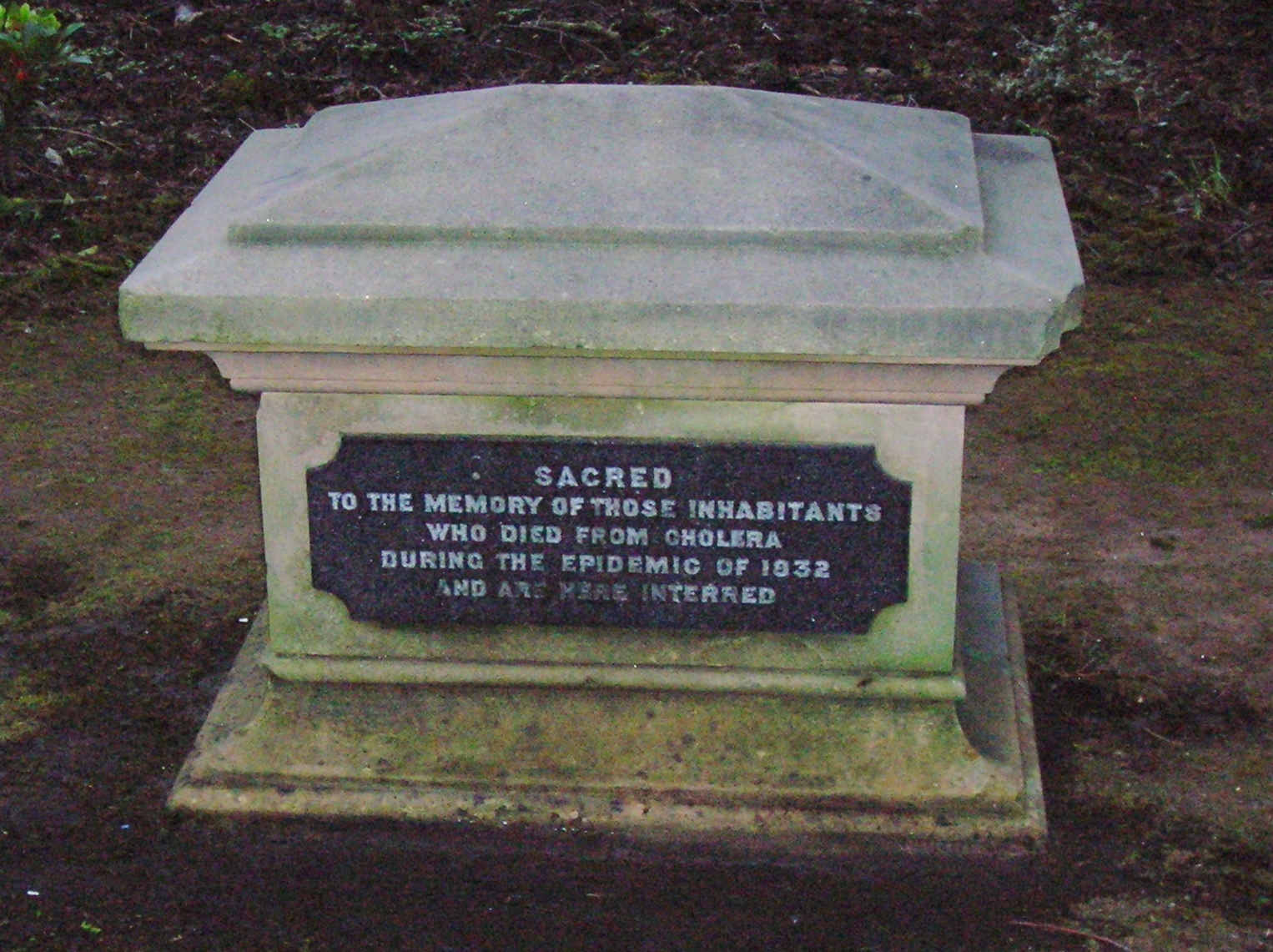
Memorial to the victims of the 1832 cholera epidemic at the Howard Park cholera pit, Kilmarnock.

A cholera pit was a burial place used in a time of emergency when the disease was prevalent. Such mass graves were often unmarked and were placed in remote or specially selected locations. Public fears of contagion, lack of space within existing churchyards and restrictions placed on the movements of people from location to location also contributed to their establishment and use. Many of the victims were poor and lacked the funds for memorial stones, however memorials were sometimes added at a later date.

== Burials ==
Often the bodies of cholera victims were wrapped in cotton or linen and doused in coal-tar or pitch before placing into a coffin. Each burial was in a pit 8 feet (2.4 m) deep and liberally sprinkled with quicklime. The bodies were sometimes burnt before interment.

Long term risks

It is considered that the cholera risk posed through disturbance of cholera pits from the 19th century is non-existent as transmission is through contaminated water or food.

== Cholera outbreaks ==
An early 19th century incidence of asiatic cholera in Europe was recorded in Russia and other continental countries in the spring of 1831. The first occurrence in England was in the Autumn of 1831 when it reached Sunderland, by 1832 it was at Exeter, and it spread rapidly through the British Isles, reaching Kilmarnock in July 1832. Other less severe outbreaks were recorded in 1849 and 1853. In the United States of America, outbreaks of cholera took place in 1834, 1849, and 1861.

== Traditions, legends, and history associated with cholera pits ==
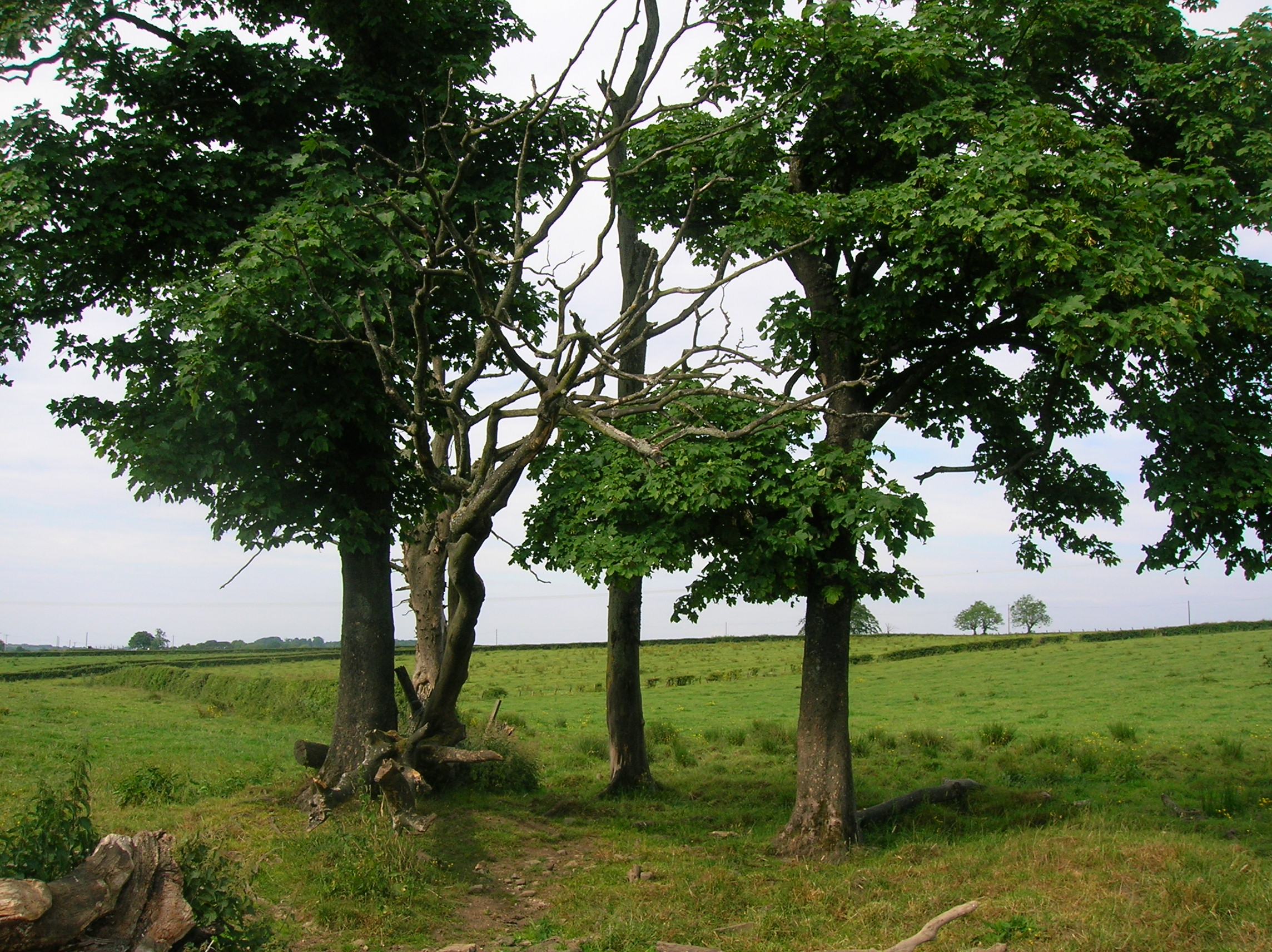
Detail of the site of the old cholera pit below South Barr farm, known locally as the 'Dead mans planting'

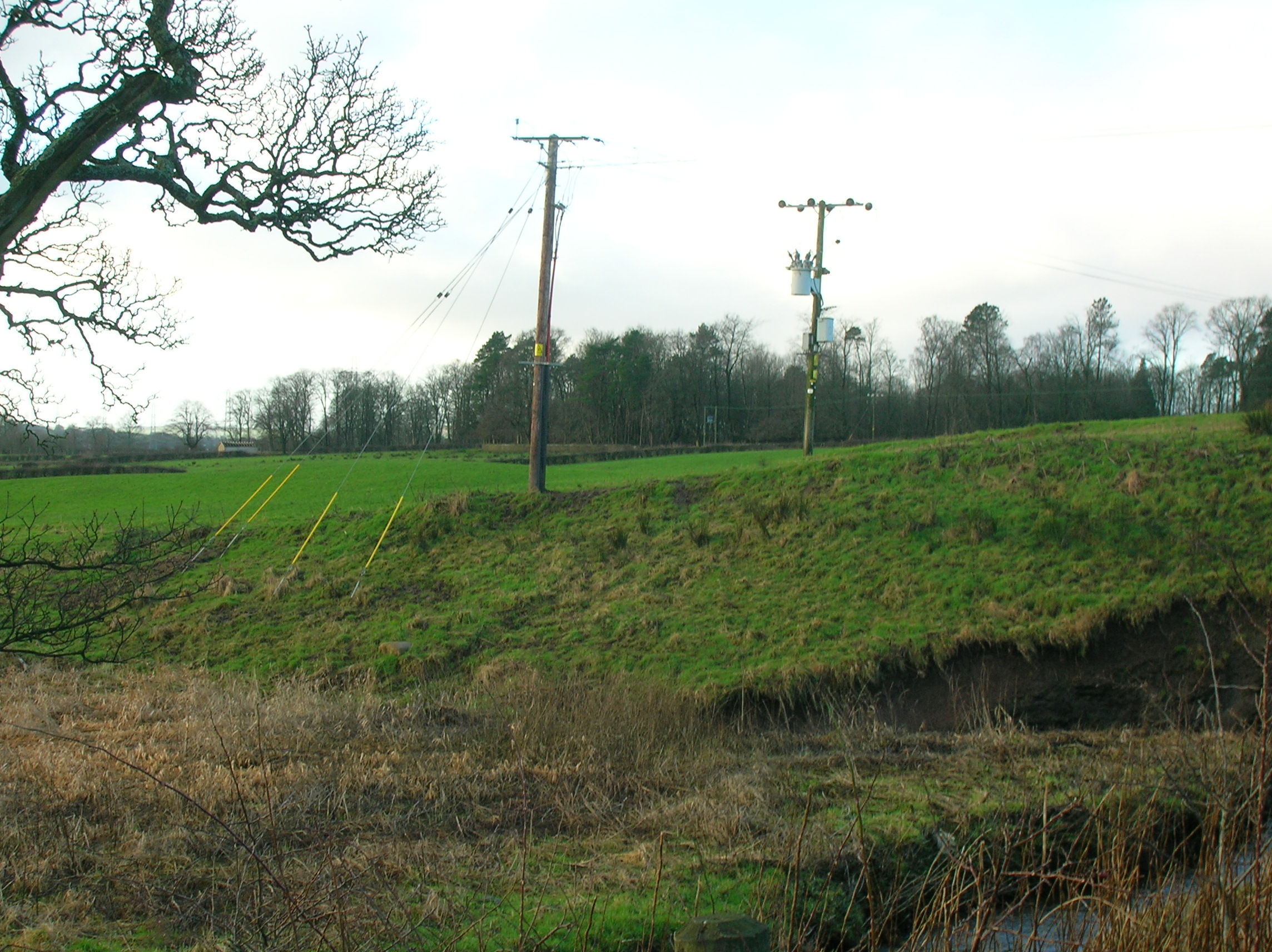
The site of the cholera pit near Spier's Old School Grounds.

At Barrmill in North Ayrshire the tradition is that the disease was passed on from a group of gypsies camped on Whin Hill that local boys had gone out to meet. Troops were regularly placed to prevent entry or exit during cholera outbreaks and normal burial in Beith was impossible and impractical, given the number of deaths. The burial site was fenced off and bordered by trees, kept in order by the Crawford Bros. from the factory until they died. It has been neglected since then.

In 1834 cholera broke out in Beith and although 'clothes were burned, bedding fumigated, stairs and closes whitewashed, a nurse who was a veteran of the Dalry outbreak was engaged and a ban placed on entertainments at funerals.' There were 100 cases in September 1834, 205 people were eventually affected resulting in 105 deaths. Some of the people were buried in the parish churchyard, but others were buried in a field, close to what became Spier's School, on the little common south-west of where the Geilsland Road meets the Powgree Burn. Robert Spier, the father of John Spier, was a member of the local Health Board.

The burial at Cleeves Cove is said to that of a member of the family who lived at Cleeves Farm. Tradition has it that "A prediction was uttered many long ages ago, that Cleaves [sic], on three successive occasions, would be the first place in the parish visited by the pestilence. The cholera of 1832 was called the fulfillment of the second visitation : accordingly, many of the older inhabitants talk of one still being in reserve."

When attempting to create a burial pit in Little Bury Meadow near Exeter, the locals attacked the grave-digger when he arrived to break the ground.

In Kilmarnock a patch of ground was purchased in Howard's Park "partly because the common-burying ground of the town was considered too small to meet the necessities of the case, and partly to prevent apprehended infection, as the graves in the new locality might remain in an undisturbed condition for a longer period."

The construction of the proposed rail link to Glasgow Airport involved disturbance of the Paisley cholera pit; however, the project was cancelled.

== Cholera pit locations ==
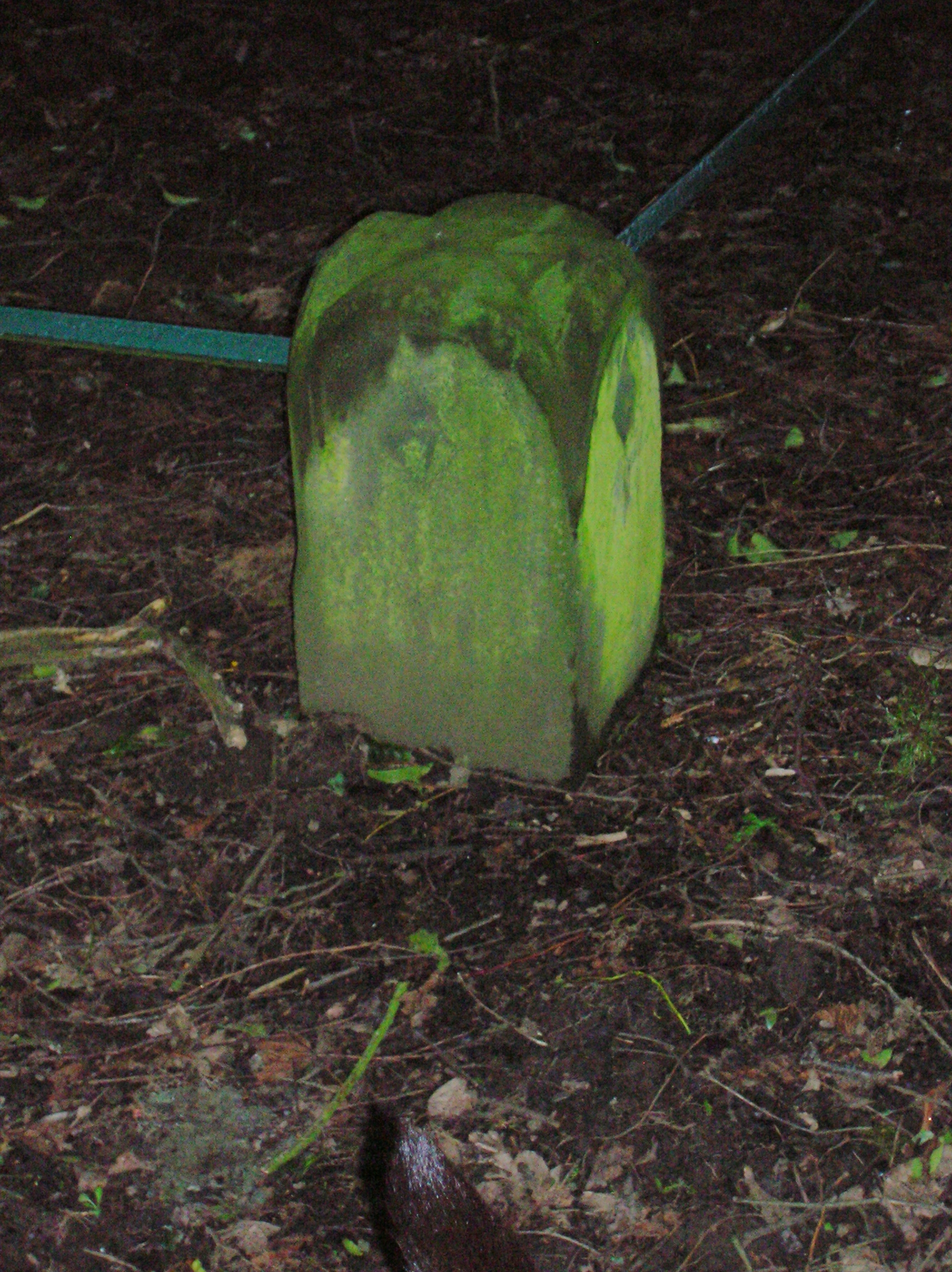
Boundary marker of the cholera pit within the Howard Park, Kilmarnock.

=== England ===
==== Devon ====
- Exeter - a burial pit was dug in 1832 at Little Bury Meadow.

==== Gloucestershire ====
- Tewkesbury - between 1832 and 1849 130 citizens died due to cholera epidemics. For the site of the pit a graveyard, formerly for the privileged, was used.

==== Manchester ====
- Saint Michael's churchyard - in one corner are the cholera pits where more than 40,000 people are said to be interred, mainly representing the common dead, the destitute, the workhouse inmates. Bodies were usually buried in quicklime to hasten their decay.

==== Nottinghamshire ====
- Nottingham - A cholera pit is located at Bellar Gate Rest Garden, at the corner of Bellar Gate and Barker Gate, commemorated with a plaque on the wall. The plaque reads: "This rest garden is on the site of an ancient burial ground associated with St. Mary's Church, and was granted to the parish for the sum of 10 shillings by Evelyn, Duke of Kingstone on 17th March 1742. In the 1830's it was used to accommodate the victims of a Cholera epidemic which struck Nottingham, and was finally closed in 1887."

==== Oxfordshire ====
- Wantage - 19 victims of the 1832 cholera outbreak were buried behind Wantage church.

==== Sheffield ====
- Norfolk Park - “a neat and appropriate monument has been erected in norfolk-road, opposite the shrewsbury hospitals, in memory of those who died in sheffield from the ravages of the cholera in 1832, and who were buried on this spot. the disease ravaged from the beginning of july till the end of october. the numbers attacked were 1,347, of whom 402 dead.” In 1834 construction started on a monument to the dead, financed in part by sales of models of the sculpture, and also with the support of the Duke of Norfolk; the monument was completed in 1835.

==== Worcestershire ====
- There is a cholera pit in Upton-upon-Severn

==== Yorkshire (North) ====
- York - During the cholera epidemic of 1832 at least 450 people were effected and 185 died. After the local graveyards became overcrowded a local Board of Health subcomitee had to find a place for the planned cholera pit. The mass grave is located near the main railway station.

=== Scotland ===
==== Highland ====
- Gallow Hill (NH 8025 9017) - a little to the north of the small wooded eminence of Gallow Hill in the parish of Dornoch was located a small enclosure which was used as a burying ground in the year 1832 for the burial of persons dying of cholera. All that survives at the burial ground is one grave-stone dated 1833.

==== Ayrshire (East) ====
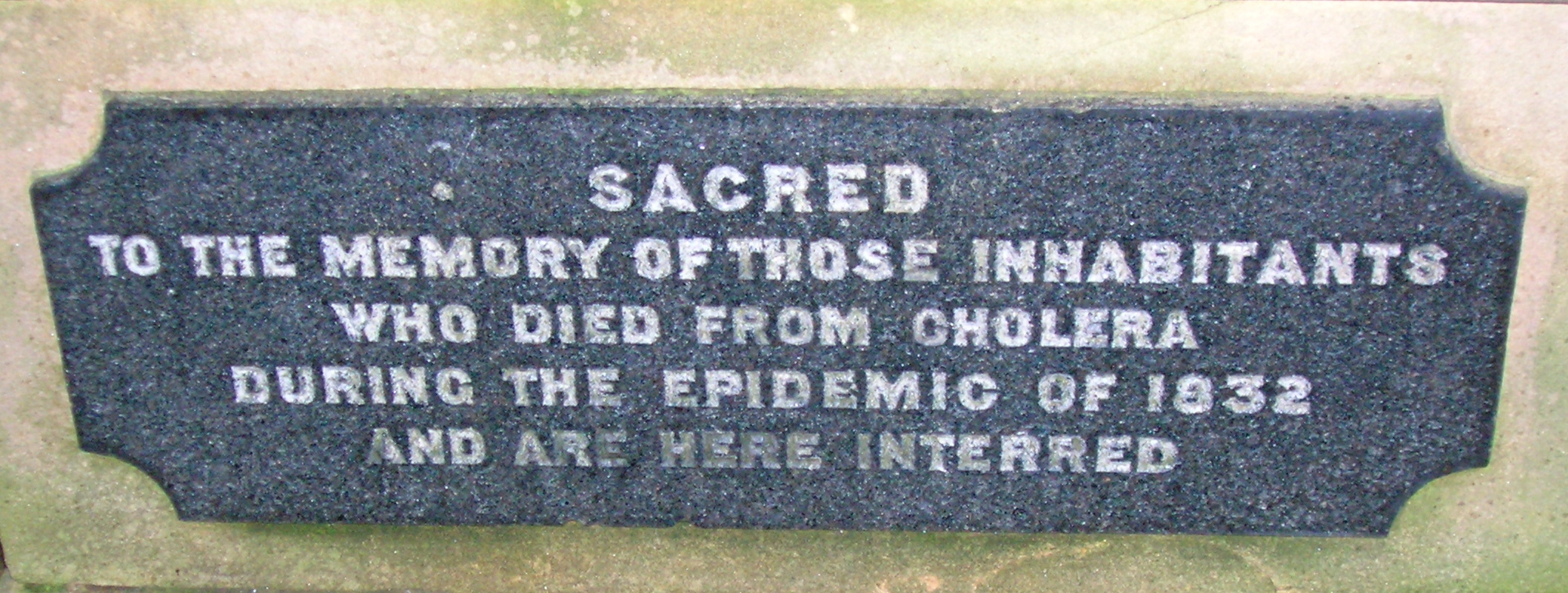
The plaque at the cholera pit memorial in the Howard Park, Kilmarnock, East Ayrshire.

- Kilmarnock (NS 4251 3702) - a number of victims buried within the Howard Park. A memorial stone is present at this site. 250 died of cholera in 1832 and 130 in 1849.
- Kilmaurs (NS 41430 40763) - St Maurs-Glencairn church has a cholera pit dating from 1832, located in the south-west corner of the churchyard.

==== Ayrshire (North) ====
- Ashgrove Estate - a cholera pit is located at the end of the Long Ride Plantation in an area known locally as Ladyacre.
- Barrmill - around 40 victims, enclosed within a triangular site near South Barr Farm on the slopes of Jameshill. Fenced off and planted with trees. Known as the 'Deid man's plantin'. A memorial cairn and plaque now exist, but no record of the victims names is known to exist. The site was restored by the Barrmill Conservation Group in 2014 and was blessed by the Revd MacDonald of Beith Parish Church.
- Beith - around 120 victims in mass, unmarked pit in a field close to Spier's school grounds.
- Blair Estate - a pit is located within the grounds of the estate.
- Cleeves Cove - a single unmarked burial, enclosed within a wall close to the Dusk water.
- Irvine - a cholera pit was marked by a mound in the Irvine Old Parish Church cemetery until the ground was levelled.
- Monkcastle House - several victims, buried within the grounds of this small estate in an unmarked pit.
- Dalry - a pit is located in a field near the Caaf Bridge on the town side of the Caaf Water.
- Stevenston - in 1871, the workmen at the nearby Ardeer Ironworks erected a monument in the New Street Cemetery to the memory of the cholera epidemics. The inscription, now broken off, read: "In this Plot Rest Six Hundred and Six of the Inhabitants of Stevenston Who died between 5th Aug. 1845 and April 1871 To Their Memory The Workers of Ardeer Ironworks Dedicate this Monument".

==== Dumfries and Galloway ====
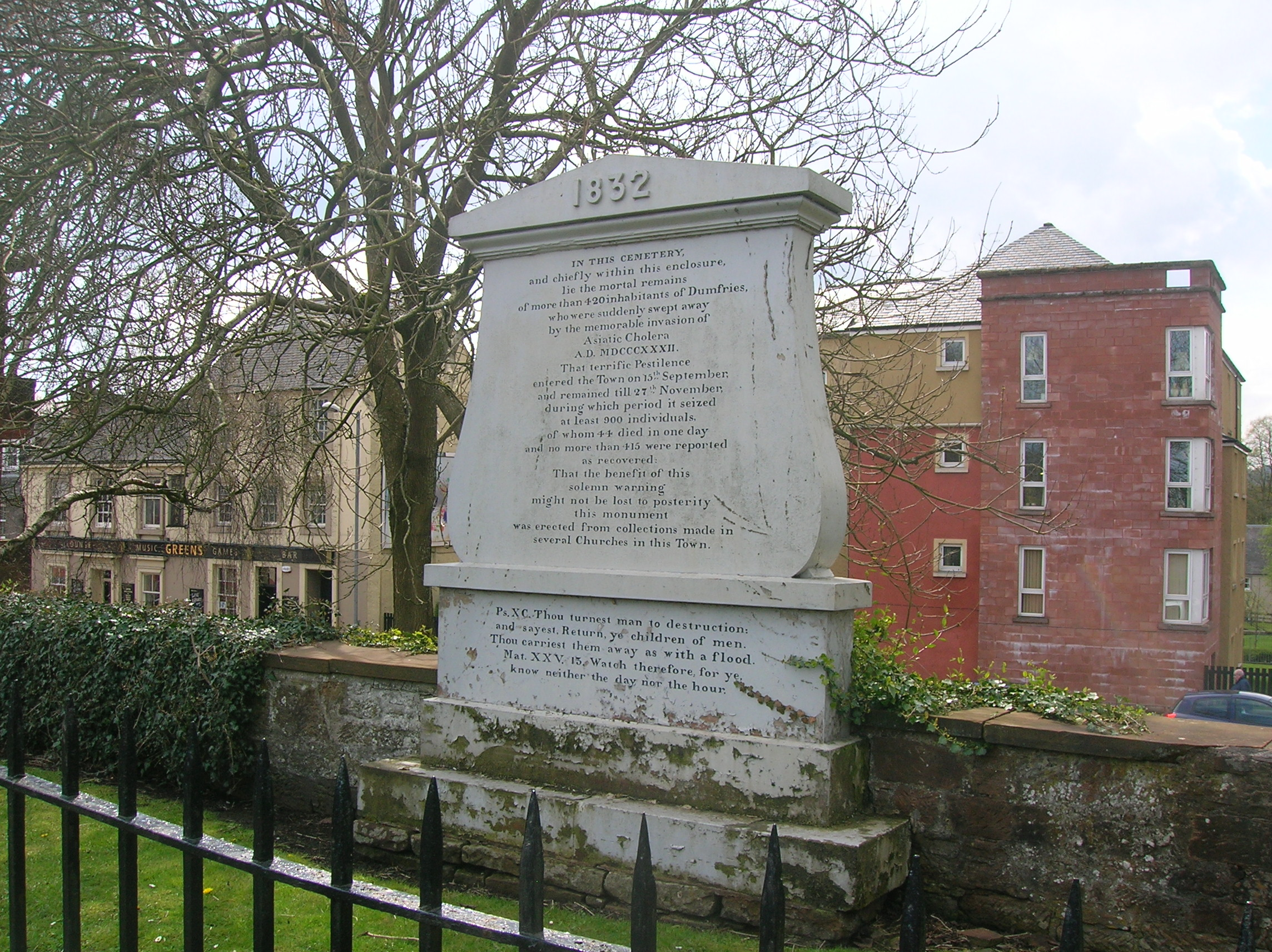
The Cholera Pit in St.Michael's churchyard, Dumfries.

- Dumfries - Asiatic Cholera claimed 420 lives at Dumfries in 1833 and the victims were buried under a mound in Saint Michael's churchyard.

==== Renfrewshire ====
- Paisley - in 1832 a burial site was located at the north east corner of what became St James Park, for the burial of circa 446 victims of the cholera pandemic which arrived in Paisley in that year. 446 people were recorded as having died and most were buried here.

=== Wales ===
==== Cardiff ====
- Royal Arcade - a cholera pit is recorded as being located beneath one of the shops in this arcade.

=== Northern Ireland ===
==== Belfast ====
- Friarsbush - the 1832 Cholera claimed so many victims that the bodies were taken to Friar's Bush where they were first burned and then the remains interred en masse within a lime-filled mound, known as the 'Cholera Pit' or 'Plaguey Hill'. In 1847 this pit was reopened to cater for the victims of a typhoid epidemic. It is estimated that the number of bodies dumped between the periods of epidemic ranges between 2000/3000. A memorial stone is present.

=== Ireland ===
==== Dublin ====
- Glasnevin - a cholera pit and memorial are located in the churchyard.
- Bully's Acre, Kilmainham - one of the main Cholera pit's in Dublin city.
- Broadstone - Found during construction works for the Luas in north side of Dublin city. (Gartland ibid)

==== Co. Waterford ====
- Dungarvan - a cholera pit and concrete memorial are situated at the side of the Dungarvan ring road, adjacent to the Shandon roundabout.

=== United States ===
==== Indiana ====
- Arba, Randolph County - the Quaker church in Arba has a long row of tombstones that do not mark individual graves, but instead are all together. These are said to belong to the victims buried in the Cholera Pit and that the tombstones were all placed there, instead of on an individual grave, since victims were all put in the pit. Outbreaks of cholera took place in 1834, 1849, and 1861.

=== Canada ===
==== Toronto ====
- St. James Park was a onetime cemetery of early York but even though those bodies were moved in 1850 the park is still home to the great Cholera pits of 19th century Toronto. It is estimated that more than 5,000 bodies are still buried beneath the grassy slopes at its north end.

== See also ==
- Spier's school
- Barrmill
- Cleeves Cove
