= Stevenston Beach =

Nature reserve in North Ayrshire, Scotland

Ardeer Beach
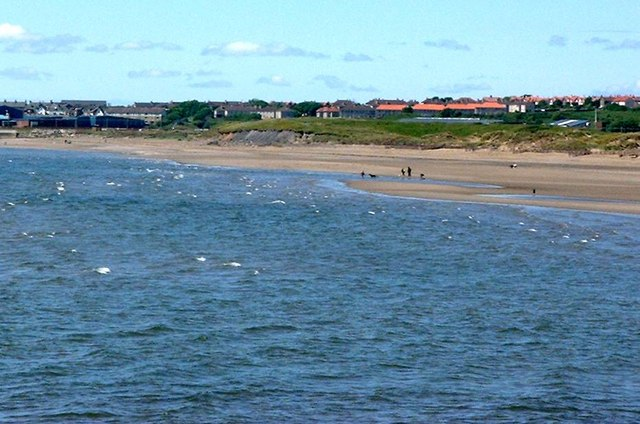
- Ardeer Beach LNR
- Interactive map of Ardeer Beach
- Type: Local Nature Reserve
- Location: Stevenston, North Ayrshire, Scotland
- Coordinates: 55.630581°N 4.759269°W
- Area: 12 hectares (30 acres)
- Created: 1999
- Operator: North Ayrshire Council
- Open: All year

Ardeer Beach is a Local Nature Reserve (LNR), located between Stevenston and Saltcoats in Scotland. It is situated on the coast, west of the Stevenston Burn. The park covers an area of 12 ha (81.5 acres), and consists mostly of sand dunes, with an area of coal mining spoil derived from Auchenharvie Colliery No. 5 pit which produced Ladyha' coal. It is ranked as the fifth most important sand dune system in Ayrshire. The dunes are also designated as a wildlife site by the Scottish Wildlife Trust.

== History ==
The sand dunes lay in the lands of Saltcoats Campbell, belonging to the Campbell's of Dovecothall and later to the Warner's of Ardeer House near Piperheugh on the outskirts of Stevenston. The early OS maps show that a magnesia works was present in the area from 1832. A dwelling known as Summerseat in 1856 extended into the northern part of the dunes, bisected by the railway that forms the present boundary. Railway tracks and tramways associated with the Auchenharvie Colliery pit and its bing or spoil heap extended into the dune slack area until lifted in the 1940s. A Trig Point was positioned on top of this bing. The promenade or sea defence for the railway forms the western boundary of the LNR and the Stevenston Burn forms the eastern boundary. In the 1970s a couple of small buildings were all that was left of the old colliery and satellite photographs show their foundations and the extent of the spoil heap.

Several 'stones' are recorded on the OS maps near the Stevenston Burn, representing permanent markers for the boundary of the Saltcoats Campbell and Saltcoats Cunninghame lands as the burn itself tends to change course. Such stones are also to be found for the same reason beside the Montfode Burn at Ardrossan North Bay between the lands of Montfode held by the Montfode family and those of Eglinton held by the Montgomeries.

The Stevenston Canal ran on the Sandylands side, parallel to where the railway is now located. The Stevenston Burn was dammed to supply the water for this shallow canal that carried coal from local pits to the harbour at Saltcoats.

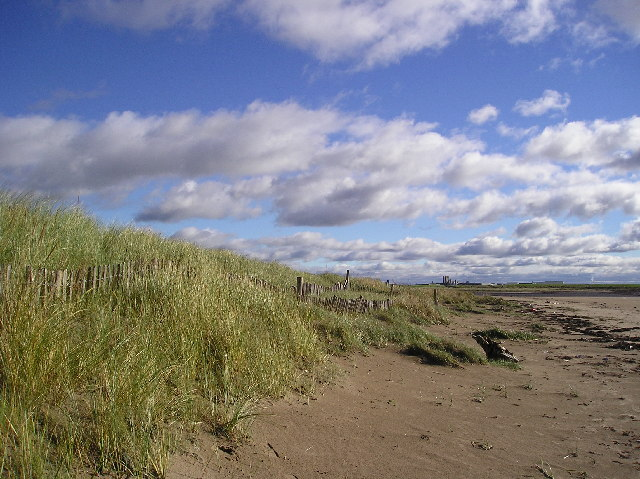
Dunes and foreshore at Stevenston Beach LNR

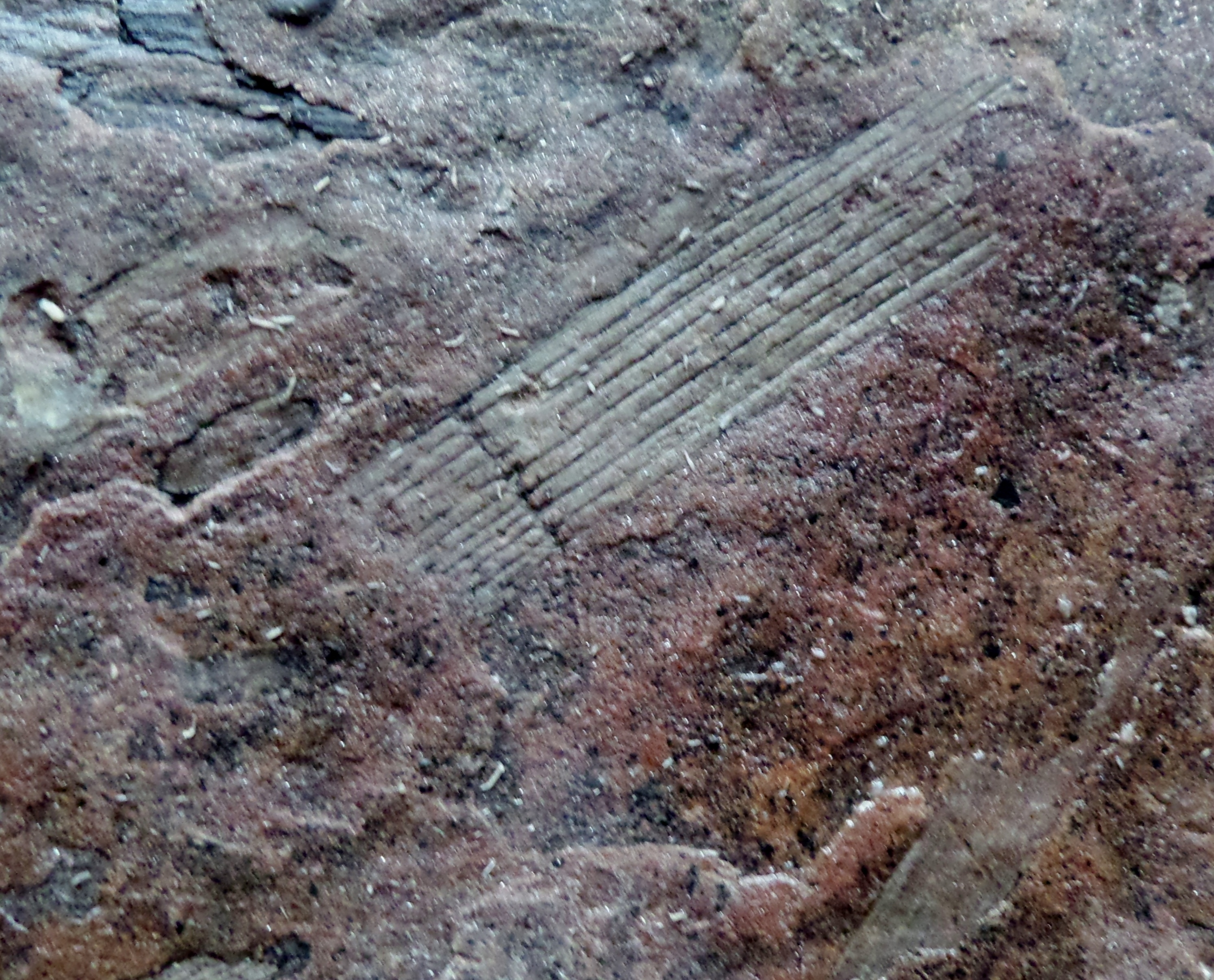
Fossil horsetail from the mine spoil heap.

James Clement records that the foreshore has taken on a very different look since the nine-hole golf course was abandoned in 1903 in favour of the 18-hole Ardeer Golf Links. The course was laid out in 1880, stretching from the old Auchenharvie Colliery No.5 pit bing as far as the perimeter of the old Ardeer Iron Works. Burnside House in George Street was the clubhouse and the first tee was on a site now occupied by Carmyle Place.

Many of the sand dunes at the Ardeer explosives works were covered with ash and then seeded with grass to stabilise them. It is not known if this was carried out at Stevenston, however very large quantities of ash were produced from coal used by the magnesia and salt works at Saltcoats.

The mine waste from the colliery has been integrated into the dune system and when exposed by wave action the shale waste often contains plant fossils such as species of Equisetum or horsetails.

The site is owned by North Ayrshire Council, including the beach below the high water mark.

== Wildlife ==
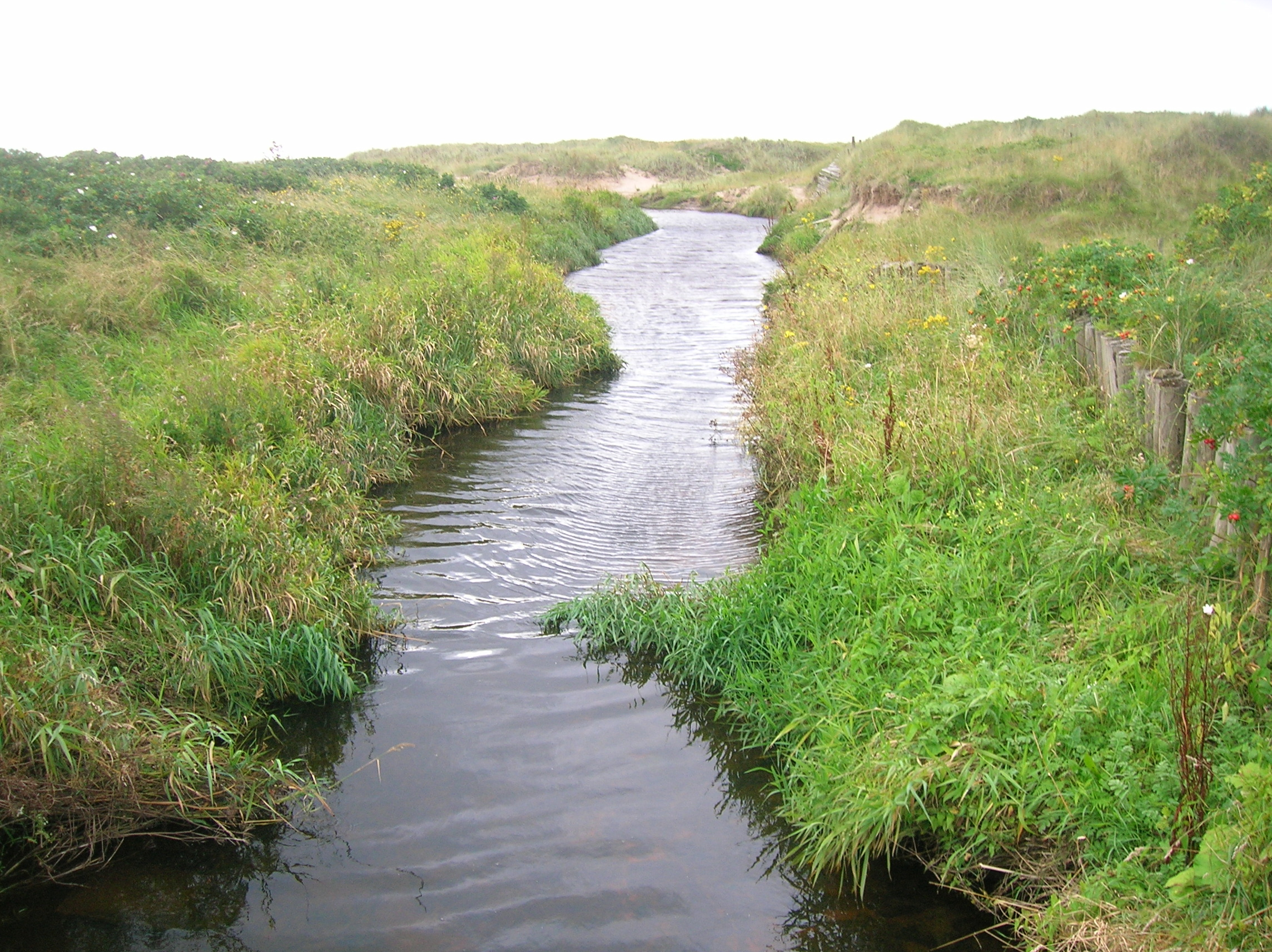
The Stevenston Burn

The reserve represents the last fully forming sand dune system in North Ayrshire following the destruction and stabilisation of the Ardeer Hills sand dune system in the 19th century. Its sands are shifting and therefore changing the structure and position of the dunes.

Plants

Rarer sand dune vegetation such as Babington's Orache (Atriplex glabriuscula) and Isle of Man cabbage (Coincya monensis monensis) have been recorded, together with typical sand dune wild flowers, including European marram grass (Ammophila arenaria), lyme grass (Leymus arenarius), kidney vetch, tufted vetch, common restharrow (Ononis repens), European searocket (Cakile maritima), sea campion (Silene maritima), prickly saltwort (Salsola kali), Scottish bluebell (Campanula rotundifolia), bird's-foot trefoil, ragwort (Senecio jacobaea), sea mayweed (Tripleurospermum maritimum) and sea sandwort (Honckenya peploides). Plants such as lyme grass were so important in stabilising sand dunes that during the 17th-century reign of William III, the Scottish Parliament passed a law protecting it.

Insects

The sand dunes and shoreline plants support large numbers and a wide variety of insect species. Butterflies and moths present include common blues (Polyommatus icarus), small heaths (Coenonympha pamphilus), small coppers (Lycaena phlaeas), the sub-species caeruleopunctata, graylings (Hipparchia semele) and the six-spot burnet (Zygaena filipendulae).

Birds

Waders found on the beach include sanderling (Calidris alba), dunlin (Calidris alpina), ringed plover, and oystercatchers are found on the neighbouring beach park. Brent goose, little stint, and golden plover are sometimes seen. The strandline on the shore contains marine invertebrates, which is a food source for flocks of twite (Carduelis flavirostris), linnet (Carduelis cannabina), pied wagtail (Motacilla alba yarrellii), and, occasionally, snow bunting (Plectrophenax nivalis). Eurasian skylark (Alauda arvensis) and meadow pipit (Anthus pratensis) are likely sightings and ravens (Corvus corax) are sometimes seen. Common snipe and jack snipe were both recorded at the site in 2014. Rooks are common and great black-backed gulls are seen in addition to the black-headed and herring gulls.

In August 1962 the Ardrossan and Saltcoats Herald (15 August 1962) reported that a penguin was spotted on the rocks at 'Sandylands Beach.' The police were informed but failed to catch it and its fate is not known. In 1998 150 plant species and 60 bird species were recorded at the site.

=== Aliens ===
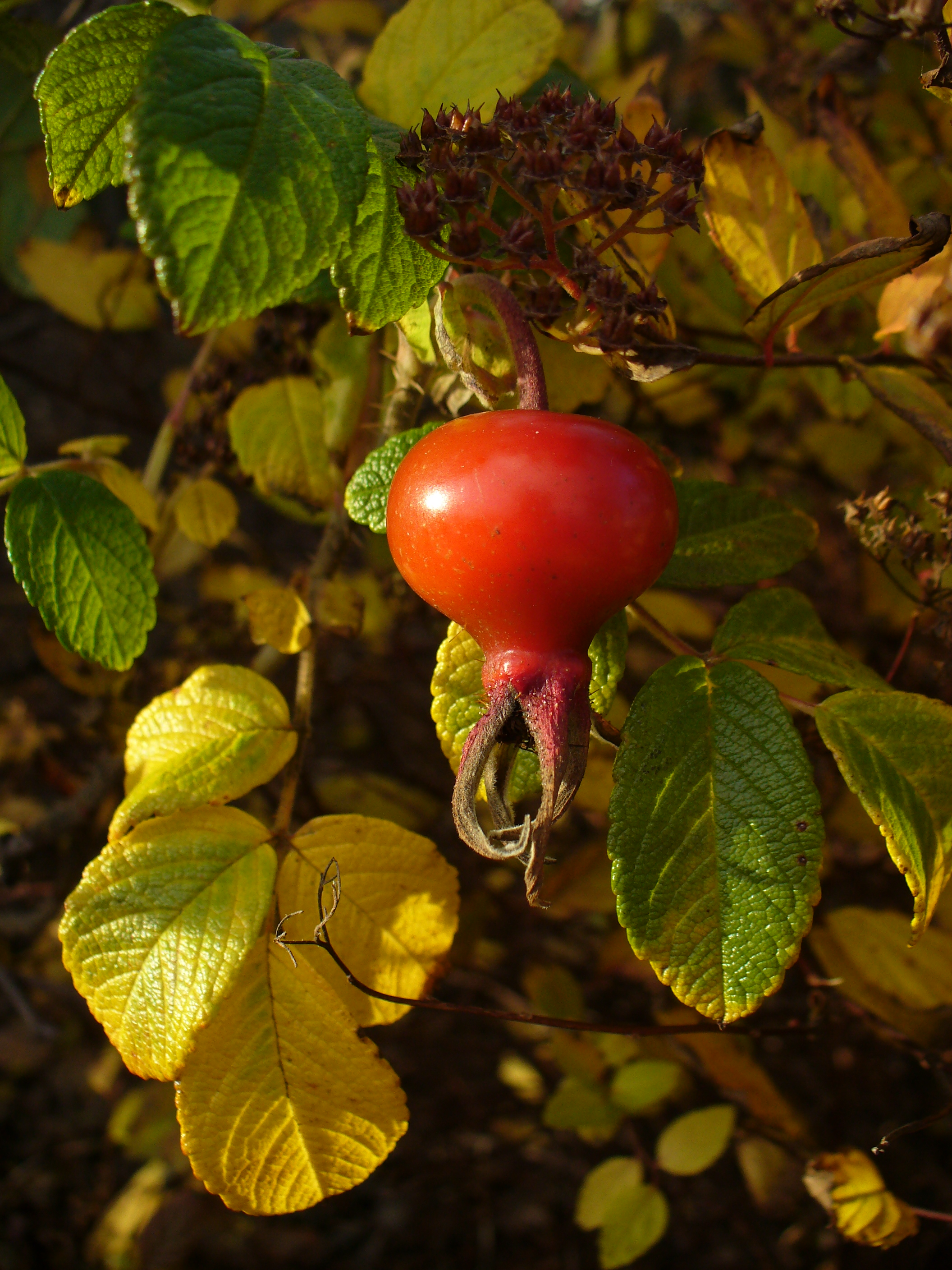
Rugosa rose hips resemble tomatoes

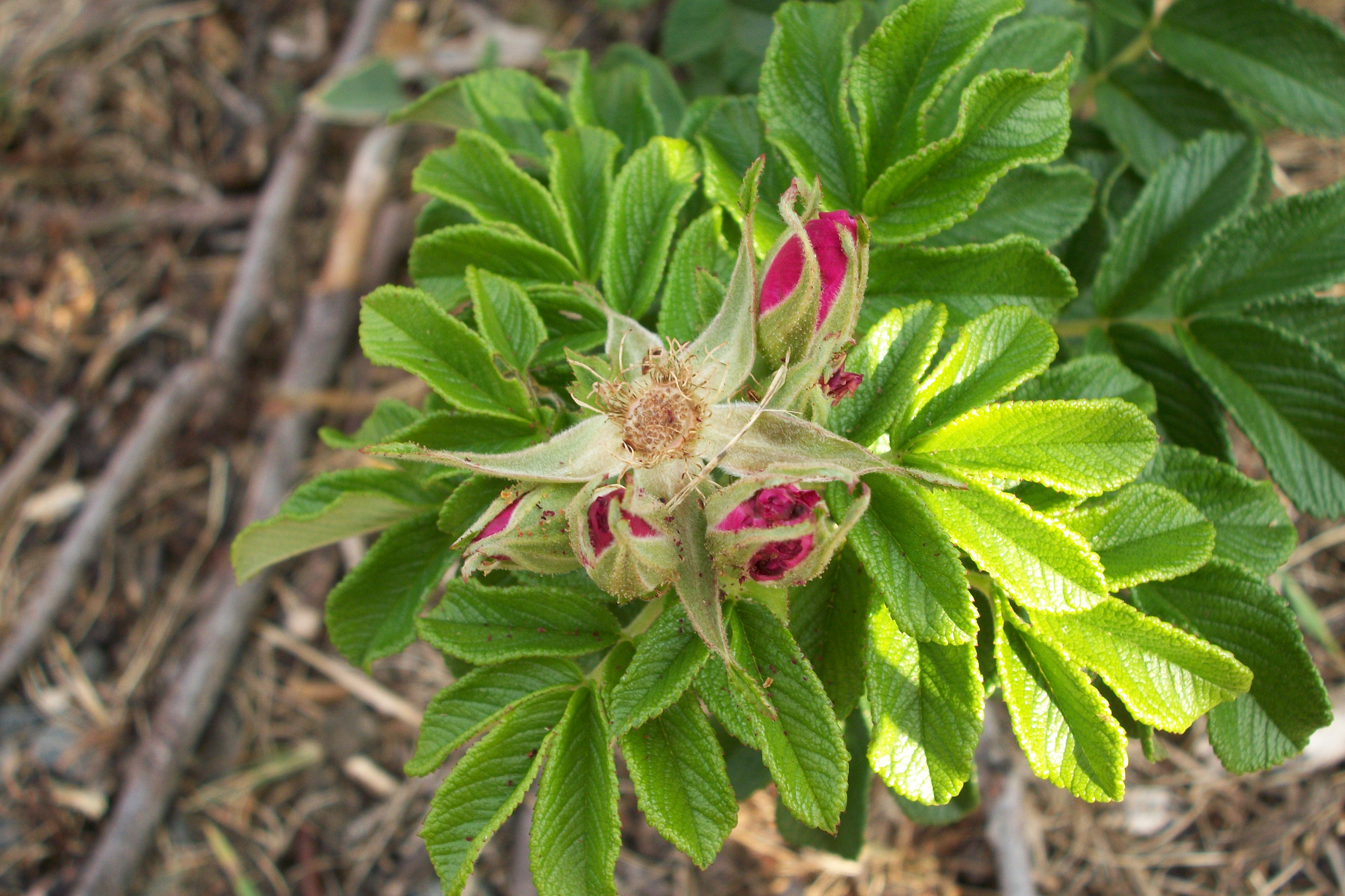
Rosa rugosa buds on Grape Island, Massachusetts

The dunes have suffered from non-native or inappropriate plantings such as alder, privet, hawthorn, michaelmas daisy, and in particular the Rugosa rose (Rosa rugosa). It is a suckering shrub which develops new plants from the roots and forms dense thickets 1–1.50 m tall. In late summer and early autumn the plants unusually often bear fruit and flowers at the same time. Planted nearby at the car park as an ornamental plant it has spread to the reserve and is now widespread and expanding. It is extremely tolerant of seaside salt spray and storms and is considered an invasive species. At Stevenston it is out-competing native flora, thereby threatening the biological diversity of this Local Nature Reserve. SNAPS (Scottish National Aerial Photography Scheme) has been used to map the areas of the Japanese rose domination. It is hoped that volunteers will be able to prevent its further spread by digging it out by hand and removing it from the site for appropriate disposal.

== Sand dune structure ==
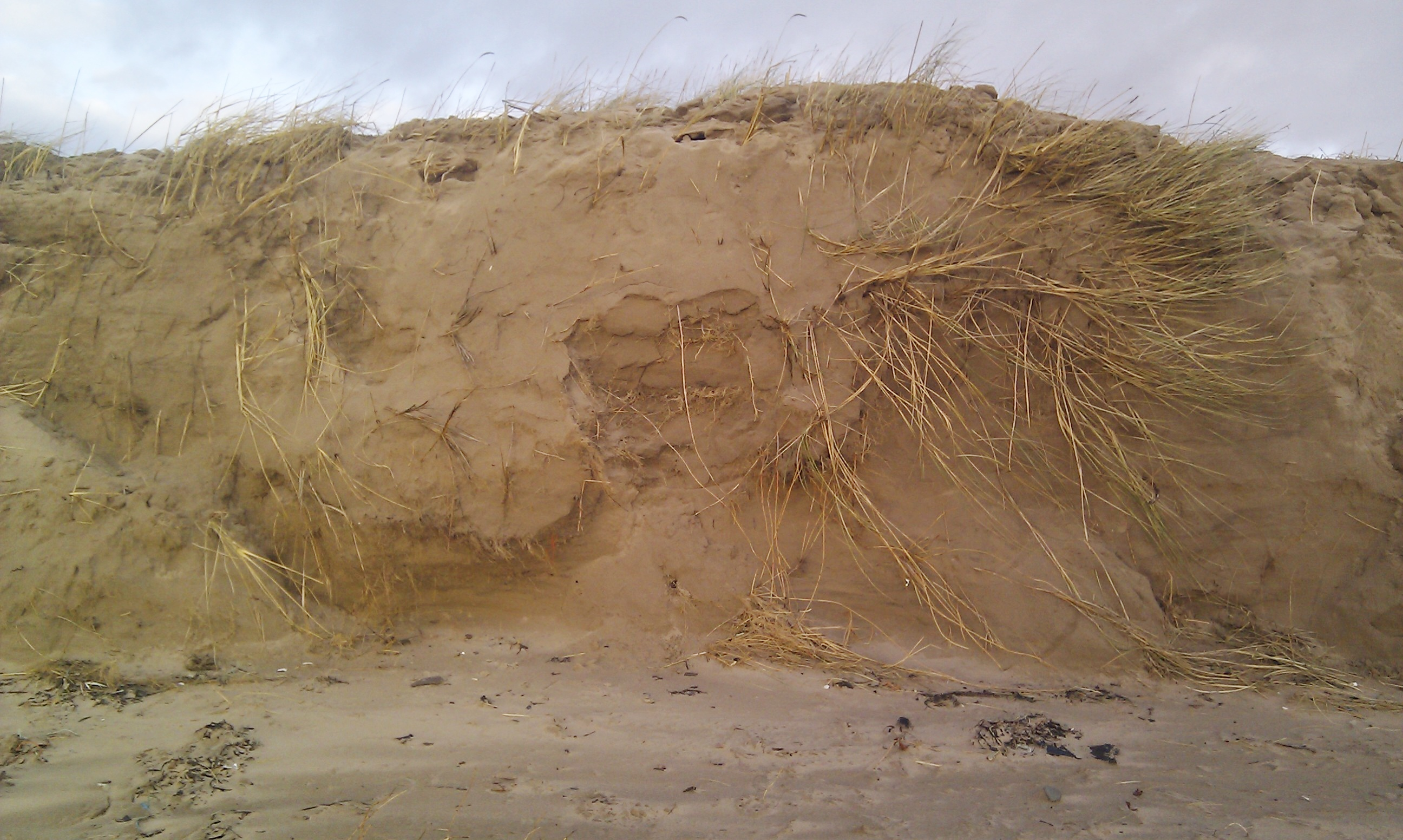
Erosion of the fore dunes due to winter storms.

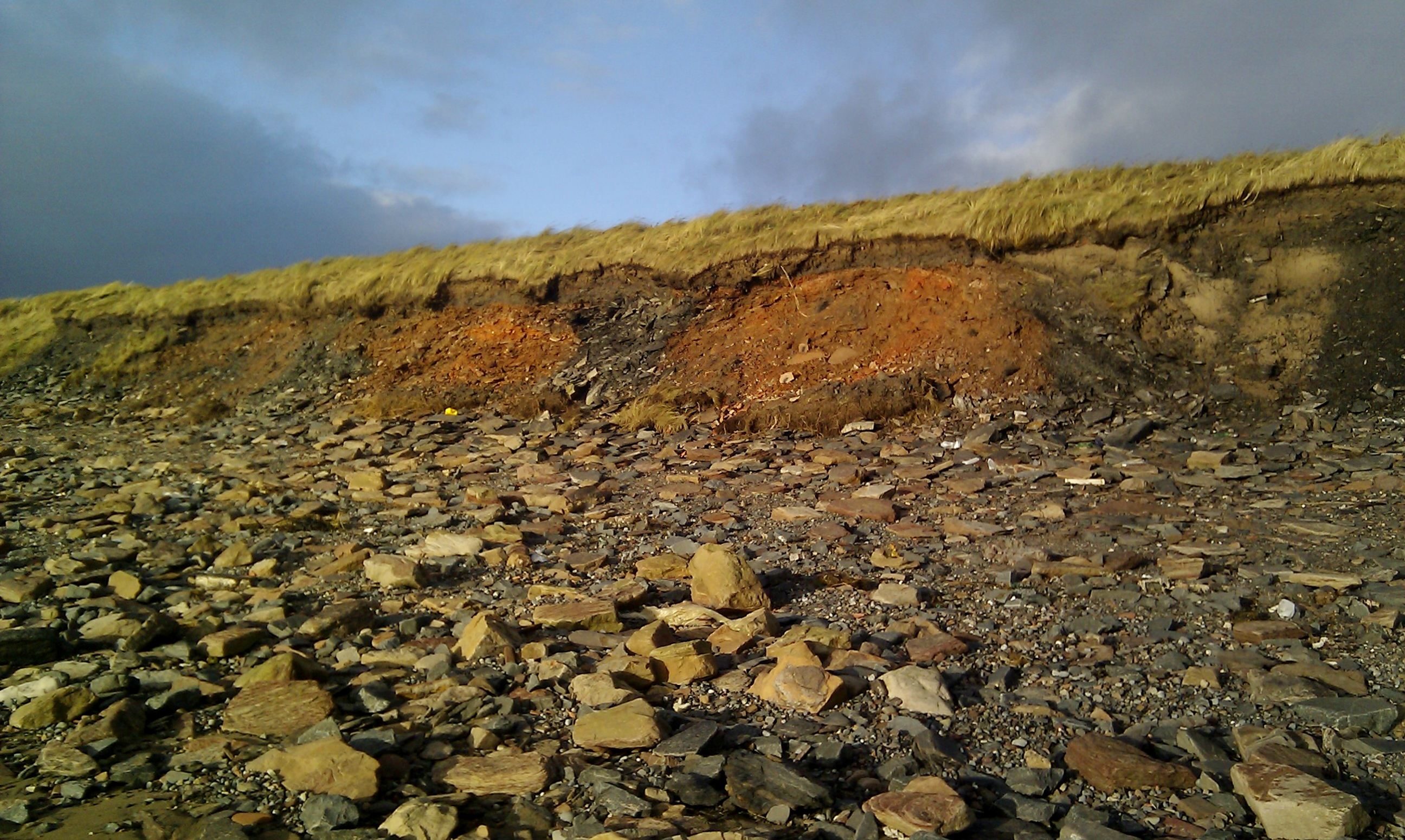
Erosion of old coal mining spoil.

The area has various types of habitat starting from the mean high water springs where low growing plants form the first barrier to wind blow and start the process of sand deposition. Above this level and out of reach of all but the highest tides, dune grasses trap sand and cause a 'pioneer zone' of mobile fore-dunes to develop. At this stage the dunes are known as 'yellow dunes' due to the lack of vegetation. Other plants colonise the areas between the grasses and as soil, water and nutrients increase and the supply of fresh sand decreases, a more diverse flora becomes established in this area, referred to as 'grey dunes'. Behind these dunes an area of dune slack exists, protected from the winds, periodically drying out. a biodiverse dune grassland with an area of wetland and scrub extends from this zone.

Severe storms and flooding from the Stevenston Burn are two of the factors that periodically have a more or less dramatic effect upon the dune system and beach structure. The storms of the winter of 2014 resulted in the linear loss of several metres of the sea facing fore dunes, exposing previously buried old fencing and also eroding the coal mine spoil heap section with concomitant release of rocks and smaller shingle that was moved by long shore drift and covered relatively large areas of the previously sandy upper beach.

Dune systems are very susceptible to fire damage started as a result of barbecues and small fires or by deliberate actions.

== Fossils ==
The spoil heap from the old mines contain a number of fossil tree fern and fossil horsetail plants and to date (2015) identified genera are Lepidodendron, Stigmaria and Calamites.

== Management ==
The North Ayrshire Council Ranger Service patrols the site and works with groups to maintain and enhance the infrastructure and wildlife elements of the site.

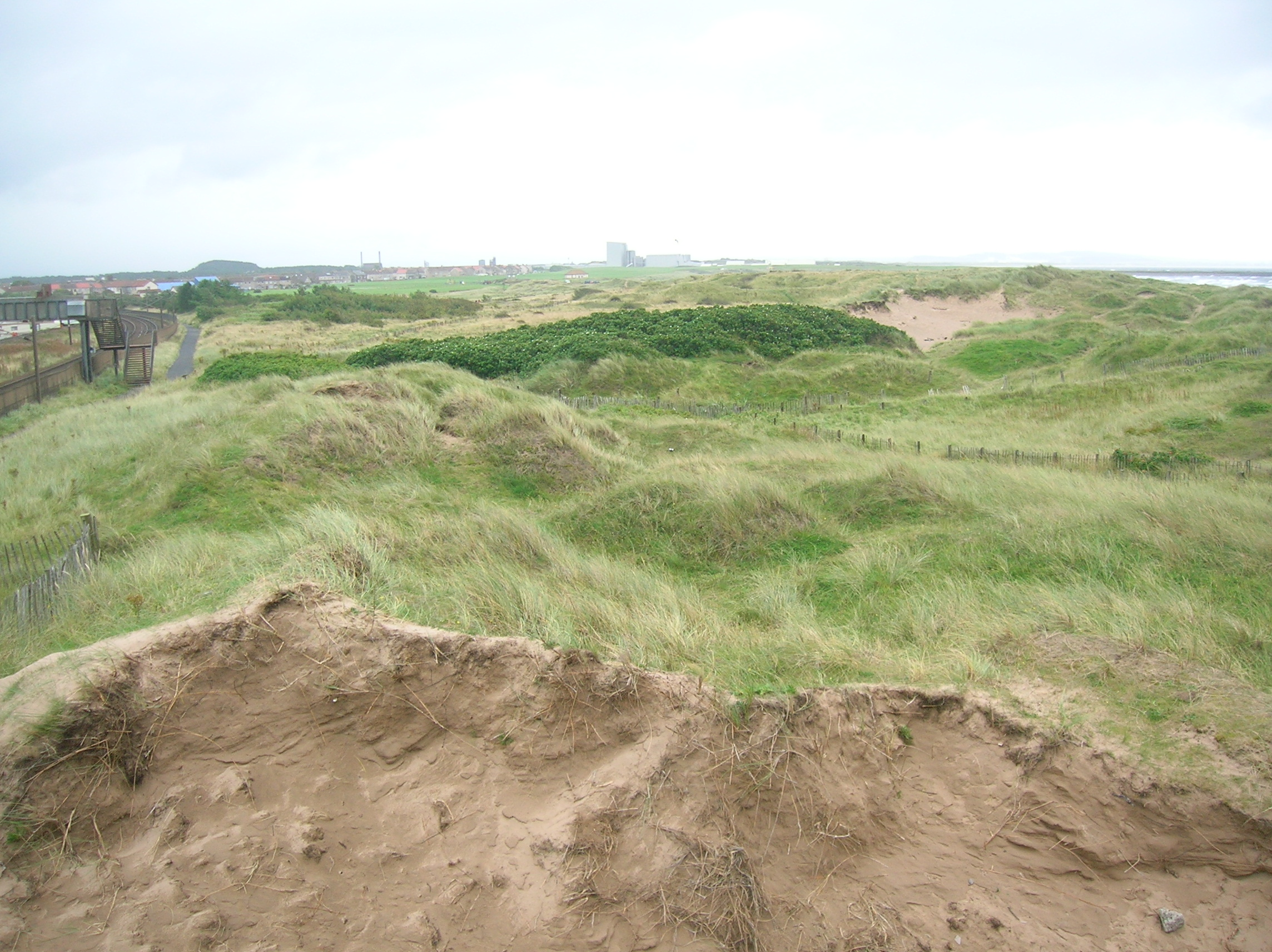
The dunes with dark patches of invasive Rosa rugosa.

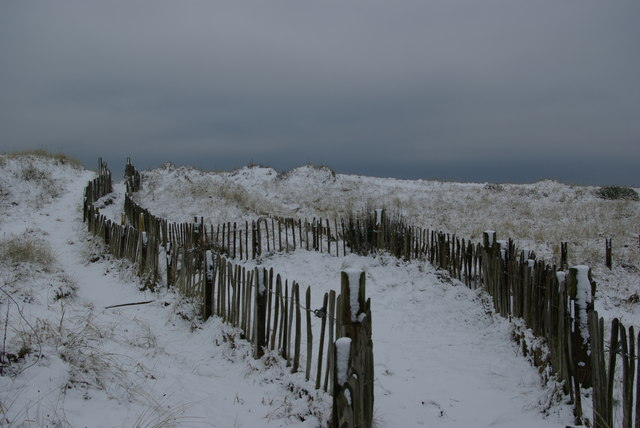
Designated paths on the reserve in winter.

Landfill tax credits collected by North Ayrshire Council provided funding to undertake environmental improvement projects within the LNR. ASH design + assessment was commissioned by the Environmental Trust for Scotland on behalf of North Ayrshire Council to undertake a project at Stevenston Beach. Construction for both projects was carried out by a local training organisation. The aim of this project was to conserve this locally scarce natural resource and reduce erosion by pedestrians and quad bikes randomlymoving through the dune area to access the beach. The completed scheme successfully resolved much of the dune erosion issues and has made Stevenston Beach LNR more easily accessible to the community and users of the nearby Sandylands Holiday Park, while helping to preserve the habitats within this important local nature reserve.

Management priorities in 2000 were sand trapping on the fore dunes, sowing new dune grasses, fencing off blow out areas, removing non-native or transplanted plants, litter clearance, signposting, and creating a network of dedicated paths.

In April 2015 a 'Friends of Stevenston Beach' was re-established and meetings held every second Sunday.

According to the Scottish Natural Heritage survey of 1998 the site consists of: 1. Beach and strand-line communities 2. Mobile dune 3. Semi-fixed dune 4. Wet, neutral grassland communities. 5. Swamps, fen communities 6. Improved grassland communities (a small section at the Sandylands end).

== Transport ==
The LNR is situated on the coast beside the B714. Access by rail is from Stevenston railway station. Regular bus routes from Greenock/Ayr/Kilmarnock and Glasgow pass the beach. The Ardrossan to Kilwinning Sustrans cyclepath runs along the edge of the reserve and joins up with National Cyclepath 7 at Kilwinning.

== Nudist beach ==
Stevenston beach is also labed as a clothing optional beach

== See also ==
- Ardeer
- Stevenston
