= Ashgrove Loch =

Loch in North Ayrshire, Scotland

- Stevenston Loch
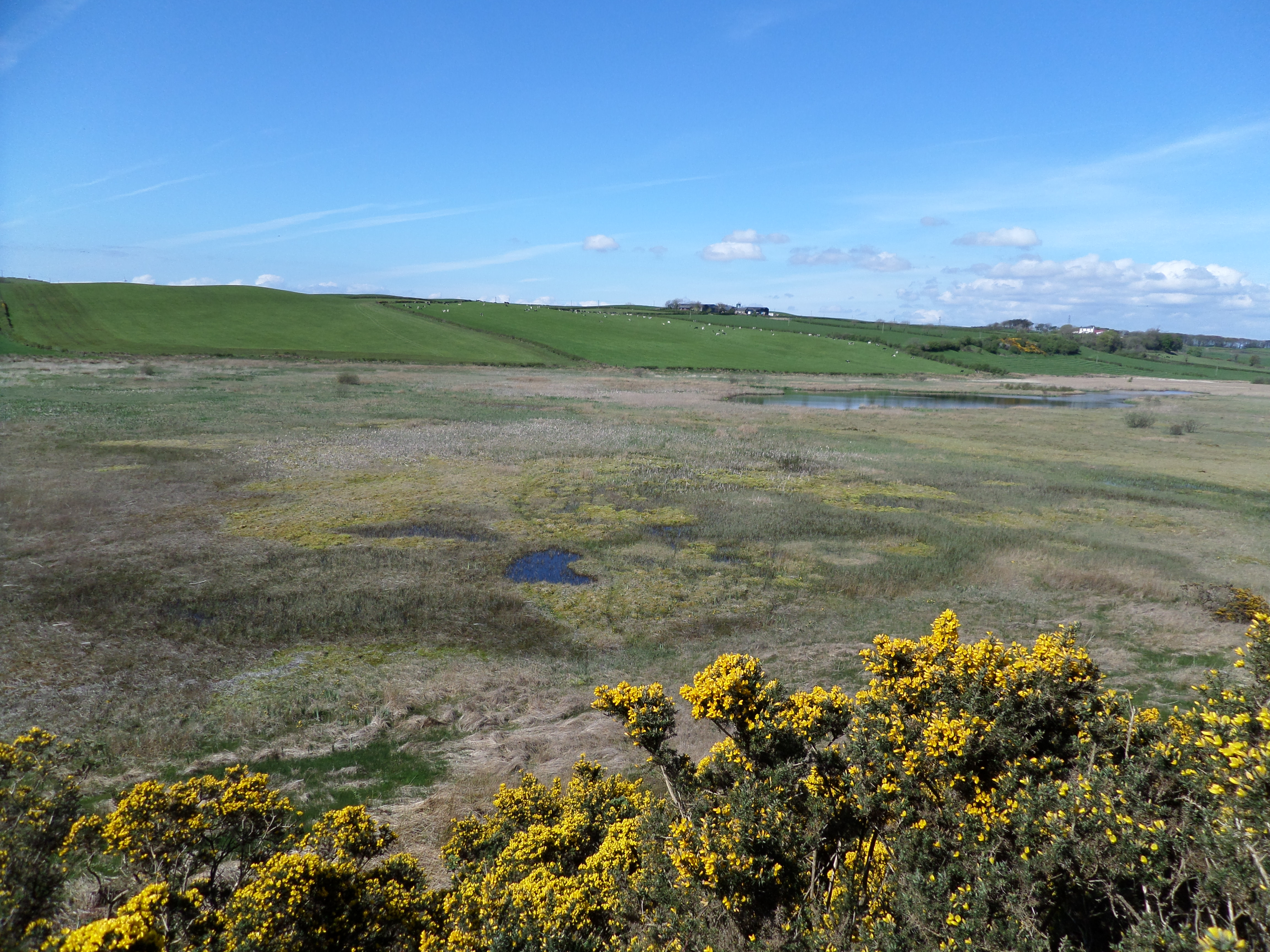
- Ashgrove Loch, from its southern shore

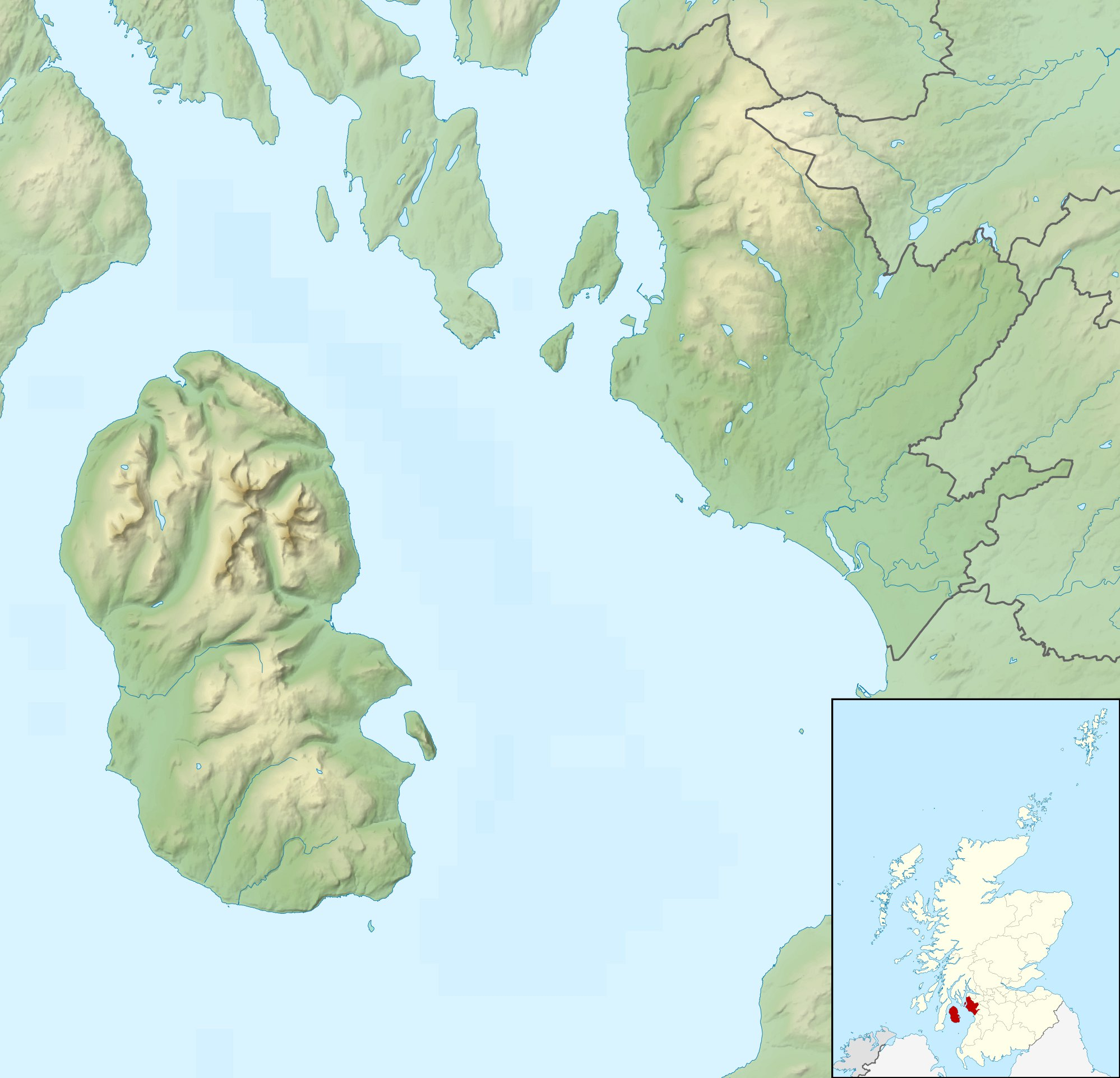
- Location within North Ayrshire
- Location: Scottish Lowlands
- Coordinates: 55°39′42″N 4°44′38″W
- Primary outflows: Loch Canal
- Basin countries: Scotland, United Kingdom
- Max. length: 540 m (1,770 ft)
- Max. width: 300 m (980 ft)
- Surface elevation: 54 m (177 ft)

Ashgrove Loch, also known as Stevenston Loch, is a mesotrophic lochan (small loch) in North Ayrshire, Scotland, approximately 2 km northeast of the town of Stevenston.

Due to artificial drains, known as cunnels, approximately 90% of the lochan's surface is covered by floating vegetation and is classed as a fen. The lochan sustains rich plant life, including two rare species, Lysimachia thyrsiflora and Cicuta virosa.

Many bird species also use the lochan, including the grasshopper and sedge warblers.

Ashgrove Loch sits on a bed of Carboniferous limestone and thus has a high mineral content.

The lochan's primary outflow, Loch Canal, is an artificial burn regulated by a sluice at Lochend, having previously powered a watermill there.

== Crannog ==
In 1868, archaeologist John Smith discovered a crannog on the loch's east shore, roughly 22 m in diameter. Several tools were found within the site, which were transferred to the National Museum of Antiquities. Since its initial excavation in the 19th century, the crannog has fallen into disrepair and no longer resembles its original state.

While Smith claimed to have found evidence of five more crannogs at the lochan's south end in 1894, aerial surveys in 1982 revealed nothing of significance.
