= Piperheugh =

Coordinates: 55.64090°N 4.74579°W

Piper-Heugh
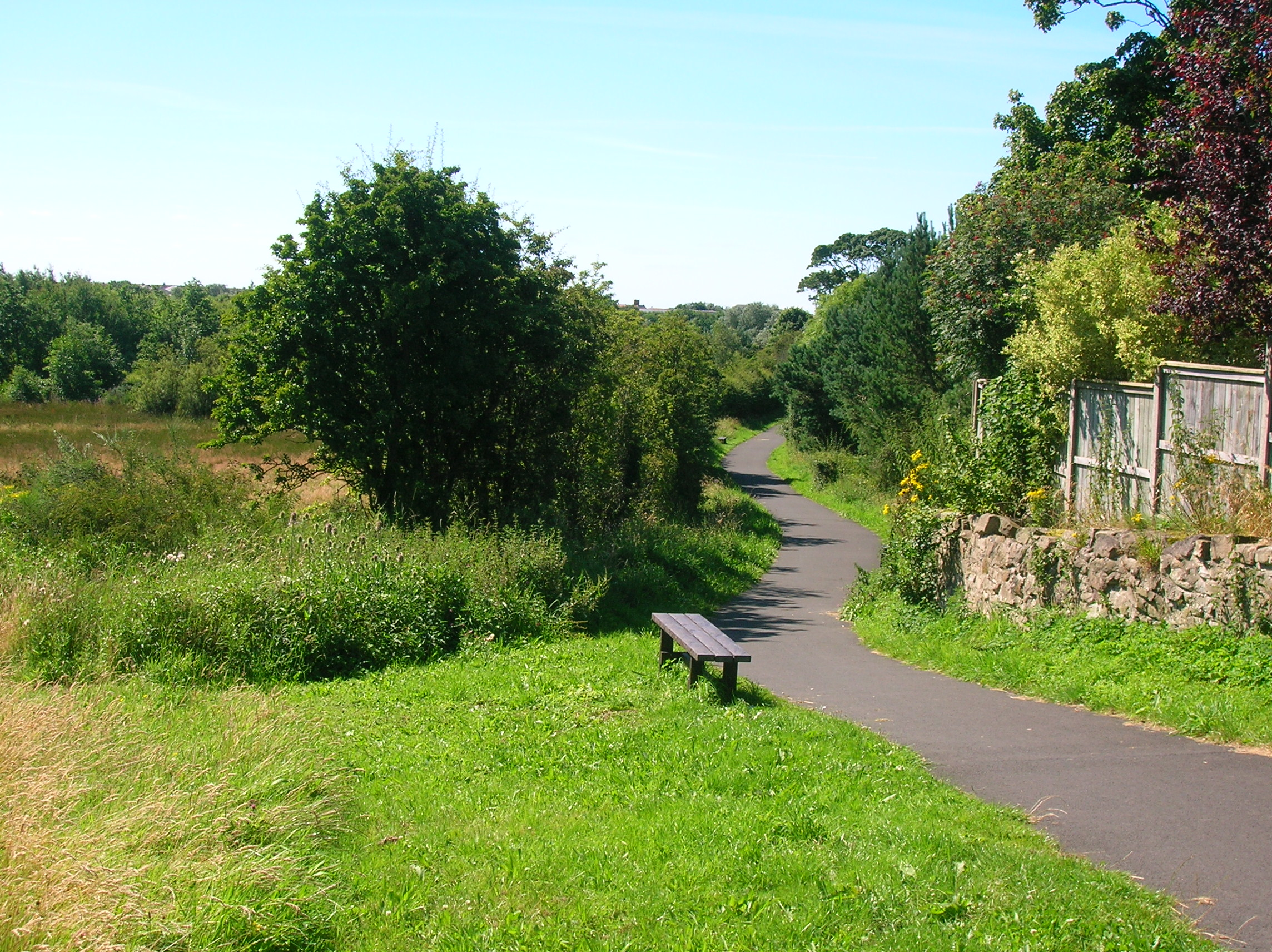
- The road below the site of Piperheugh hamlet
- OS grid reference: NS 2742 4201
- Council area: North Ayrshire
- Lieutenancy area: Ayrshire and Arran
- Country: Scotland
- Sovereign state: United Kingdom
- Post town: Stevenston
- Postcode district: KA20
- Dialling code: 01294
- Police: Scotland
- Fire: Scottish
- Ambulance: Scottish
- UK Parliament: Central Ayrshire
- Scottish Parliament: Cunninghame South

Piperheugh, Piper's-Heugh, or even Piperhaugh was a hamlet in North Ayrshire, Parish of Stevenston, Scotland. The inhabitants were recorded as famous manufacturers of trumps, or Jew's harps. The village only survived as ruins by 1837 and no remnants are now visible, not even the plantation that bore its name. 'Pyperheugh' and 'Pypersheugh' are both recorded in the 18th century.

The site of the hamlet or village of Piperheugh is said to have been on the north-east side of Woodhead Plantation, where on the road to Guest Mailling and Ardeer Mains, once called Little Dubbs (now Ardeer Steading), was located a clump of trees known locally as the Pipers-Heugh Plantation, and extending eastwards towards the crossroads. Smith records it as being located beyond the east end of the bank upon which Ardeer House once stood.

== History ==
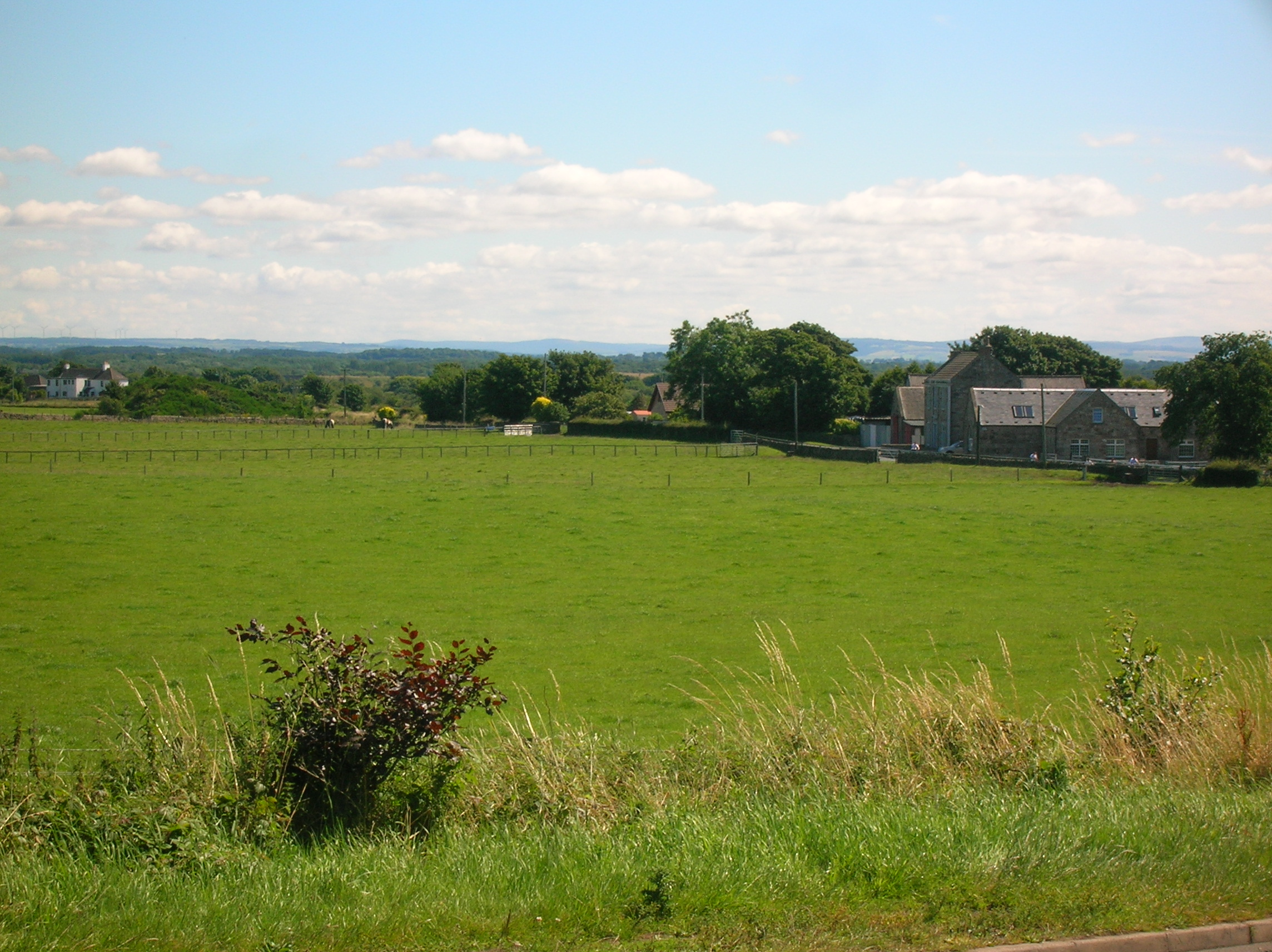
Ardeer Mains (Little Dubbs) from the site of the Piperheugh Plantation.

The village is said to have been of some antiquity and as stated, the chief occupation was the making and possibly the playing of trumps or Jew's harps. A record of 1627 records the death of one Johana Logane, wife of a trump-maker in Stevenston. From the place name it has been suggested that the craftsmen were not only artificers in brass and iron, but also handlers of the harp and probably players of the bagpipes. In the Statistical Account of Stevenston parish by the minister Dr Wodrow, published in 1791, the village is stated to have been composed of between fourteen and sixteen houses, standing about a quarter of a mile east of Stevenston. Blaeu's map of 1654, based on Timothy Pont's map of circa 1600 clearly indicates Pyperhauck (sic) without Stevenston even being recorded. A place named 'Pypermuck' is shown near Saltcoats. The 1856 OS map records the Site of the village of Piperheugh between the copse at the 'Y' road junction and the Woodhead Plantation.

A heugh or heuch in Scots is a dell or a steep bank, especially one bordering a river or the sea. In this context it is worth noting the River Garnock used to run along a route that included a section through nearby Dubbs and below Ardeer House; Ardeer sand dunes being effectively an island at that time.

=== The abandonment of Piperheugh ===
The area upon which the village once stood is now partly developed and the Piperheugh Plantation has been felled. It is not clear what led to its abandonment, leading to the suggestion that Piperheugh was essentially an artisan encampment of gypsies or tinkers rather than a village of permanent dwellings, although it was significant enough to appear on Blaeu's map in the 17th century. Ardeer House (demolished 1968) and estate owned the land on which the hamlet stood and this would have had a bearing on the fate of the settlement. Robin Campbell states that the 'Piper's Haugh' was "Swallowed up in the sands of Ardeer." Such a suggestion is possible when it is looked at in the context of dry summers, such as that of 1826, when the wind blown sands from Ardeer caused havoc for miles inland.

== Trumps ==
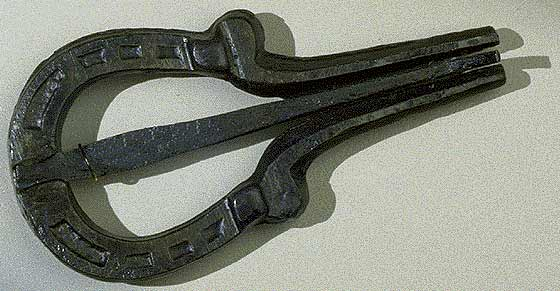
A trump or Jew's harp (c. 1860s).

The Jew's harp was called a 'trump' in Scots, also referred to as the tongue of the trump. It is not known why the village had the apparent monopoly of the 'trumps' trade, however other examples exist, such as Stewarton for Scots bonnets, Colinsburgh for corkscrews, and Culross for girdles.

The Jew’s harp was one of the most popular and cheap musical instruments and records show that hundreds of thousands were imported from at least the 15th century. It was thought that manufacturing of the instrument in the UK did not start until the Industrial Revolution, when it was centred on Dudley in the West Midlands. Piperheugh may be unique as the only known pre–Industrial Revolution Jew’s harp manufactory.

Dr Landsborough in 1837 wrote that although the hamlet was in ruins, the spirit of the pipers and harpers lived on in the fondness that the people of Stevenston had for music.

== Coal mining ==
A relatively thin dislocation, gall or dyke is present in the coal strata in the area and is known as the Piperheugh Gall or Step, running in a south westerly direction from Ardeer Mains Farm towards the River Garnock; in 1798 this is recorded as the 'Piper Hugh Step'. The other dislocation is the Caponcraig Gall which is about 20 yards thick. The coal seams here were known as the "West Field" of Stevenston Colliery. It was important that such dislocations (barriers) were left unpierced to prevent water flowing between the adjacent coal fields. One of the old coal workings contiguous to the hamlet was called the Piper-heugh pit.

In 1798 a report recorded that the mines in the vicinity of Pypersheugh (sic) Gaw and found them to be comparatively dry thanks to the dyke not having been pierced.

In 1725 the Earl of Eglinton was granted a 57 year tack from Patrick Warner to work coal within the lands of Dovecothall and Piperheugh. In 1774 Patrick Warner and Robert Reid Cunningham signed a mutual agreement to work coal on the lands of Ardeer and Pyperheugh (sic).

== Micro-history ==
The Kirk Session records of April 1700 show that John Glasgow of Pipers-Heugh (sic) applied to the session for a testimonial, however this was refused on the basis of his having stolen a goose on a Sunday and that he had been drunk on the Saturday before. He was rebuked by the minister in front of the congregation and was then given a testimonial.
