= Stevenston =

Coordinates: 55.645°N 04.758°W

Stevenston: Scottish Gaelic: Baile Steaphain; Scots: Stinston
- Town
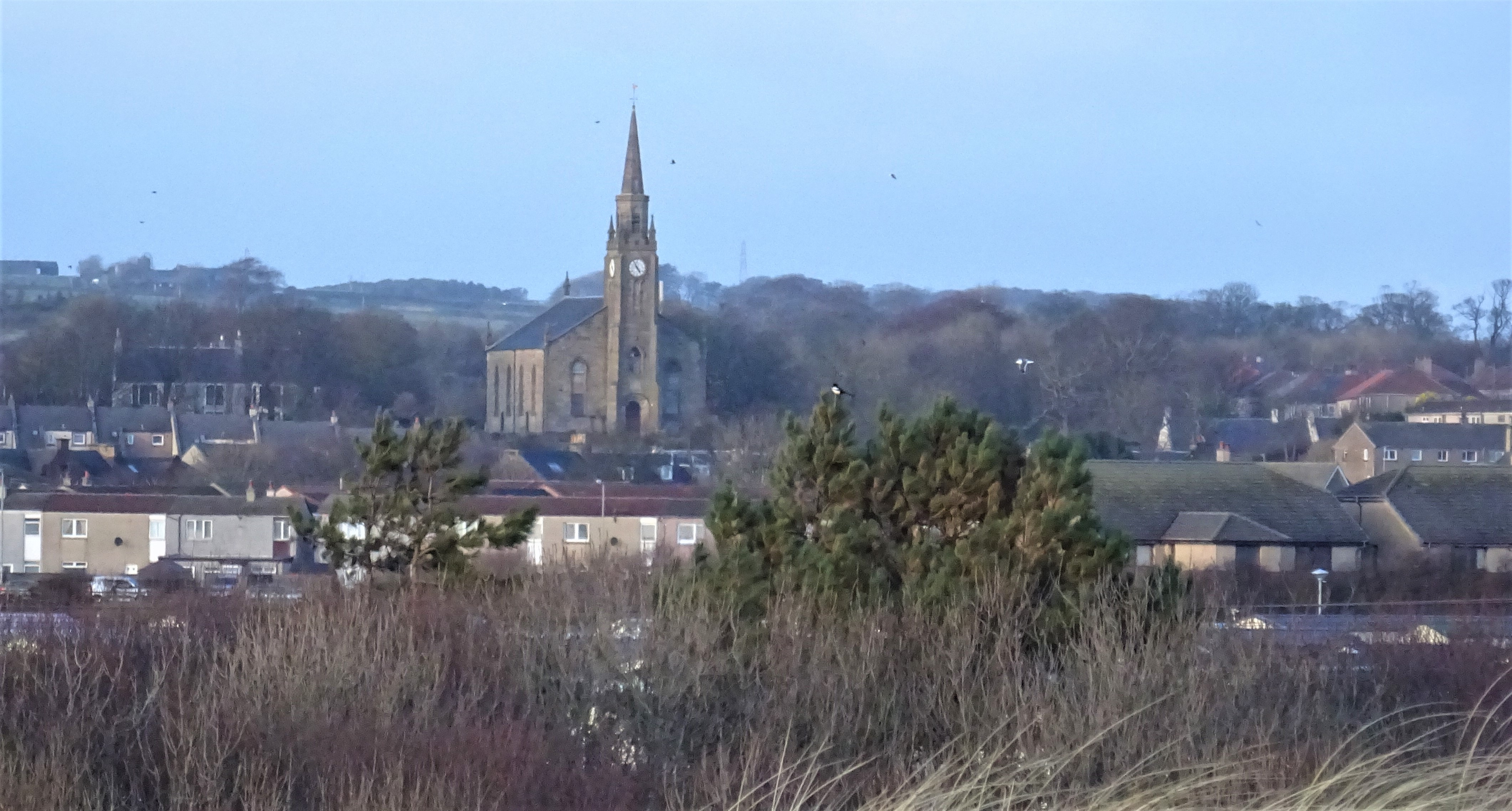
- Stevenston High Kirk and town from Stevenston Burrows

- Location within North Ayrshire
- Population: 9,050 (2020)
- OS grid reference: NS265425
- Council area: North Ayrshire
- Lieutenancy area: Ayrshire and Arran
- Country: Scotland
- Sovereign state: United Kingdom
- Post town: STEVENSTON
- Postcode district: KA20
- Dialling code: 01294
- Police: Scotland
- Fire: Scottish
- Ambulance: Scottish
- UK Parliament: North Ayrshire and Arran
- Scottish Parliament: Cunninghame South

Stevenston (Scots: Stinstoun, Scottish Gaelic: Baile Steaphain) is a town and parish in North Ayrshire, Scotland. Along with Ardrossan and Saltcoats it is one of the "Three Towns", all of similar size, on the Firth of Clyde coast; the easternmost parts of Stevenston are about 1/2 mile (800 metres) from western parts of Kilwinning, the A78 trunk road runs between the settlements.

== History ==
The town is named after Stephan Loccard or Lockhart, whose father obtained a grant of land from Richard de Morville, Lord of Cunninghame and Constable of Scotland, around 1170. The town is first mentioned in a charter of c. 1240.

The Castle Hill near Hullerhirst may have once been the site of a small stone tower. Under a sand mound near Dubbs a stone pavement, coffin, and large boulder were discovered in 1832. Numerous flint tools have been found in the sands of Ardeer.

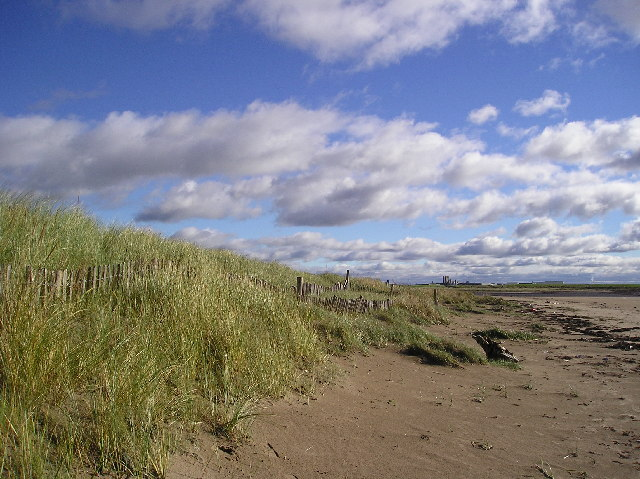
The Stevenston sand dunes

The town's main link with Robert Burns is that Mayville House was the birthplace in 1768 of Miss Lesley Baillie. Robert Burns met her in 1792 and described her to a friend as "the most beautiful, most elegant woman in the world". She inspired one or two of his love poems, in which she is described as 'Bonnie Lesley'. A memorial now stands in her memory and is situated between Sinclair Street and Glencairn Street.

To the north of the town sits the ruin of Kerelaw Castle, with a history spanning over 800 years. Nearby was Kerelaw House, once home to the family of Alexander Hamilton and later the family of Kenneth Campbell VC RAFVR; however, the house was demolished in the early 1970s.

A hamlet known as Piperheugh once existed near Woodhead Plantation and Ardeer Steading. It was famed for the manufacture of trumps or Jew's harps.

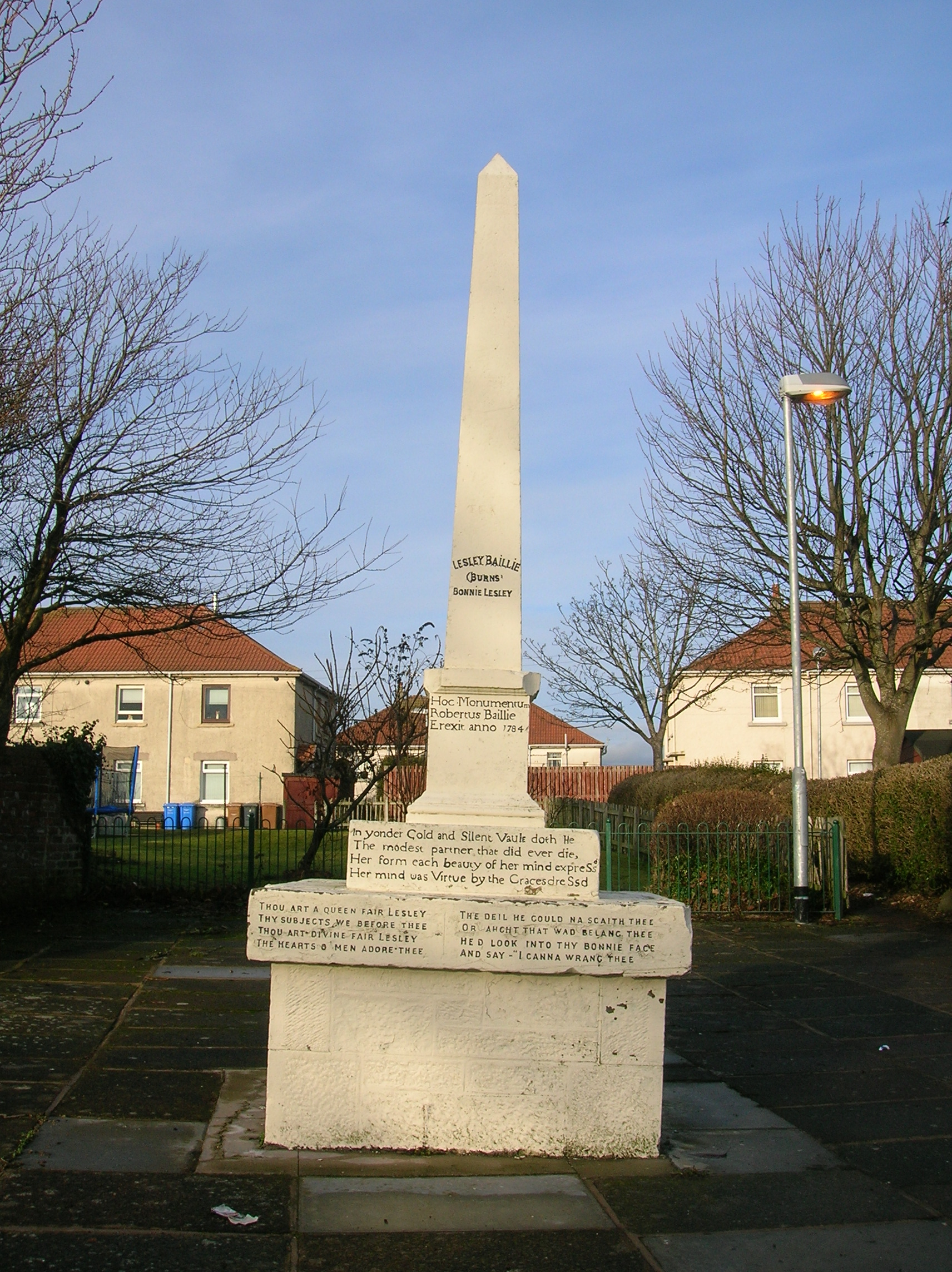
Memorial to Bonnie Lesley Baillie

The regeneration of Irvine Bay includes the development of Stevenston Business Centre on the site of the former Grange Bingo Hall.

Ardeer estate

Deucathall or Dovecothall was the previous mansion house at this site, standing in the Hillcrest Drive area, but now totally demolished. It was the residence of George Campbell, a relation of the Loudoun branch of that clan. The new Georgian-style mansion, Ardeer House was located near to the Ardeer Bowling Club and after being sold to Nobels' in 1929 it was used as the Nobel Recreation Centre for some years, but was sadly demolished in 1968. One of the most distinguished owners in the later 17th century was the covenanter Patrick Warner, a minister who was forced to escape to Holland after the Battle of Bothwell Bridge. These houses once stood on the sea coast and the site is said to have been a favourite anchorage ground, fragments of boats and anchors having been found at various points here and further inland. A sea-washed cave is located a little behind the house. The field behind the mansion house was once called the Temple Field. A miniature rifle range was once located in the old walled gardens.

The Revd. Patrick Warner had picked up skills in land reclamation during his exile in Holland and his first act was to drain the bogs by cutting the Master Gott, linking several small lochans or dubbs, and it was this drain that was later partly incorporated into the Stevenston Canal.

The Ardeer Cave

A cave exists at the site of the old mansion, and remains of a dressed stone frame for an iron grille over a hole in the cave roof suggested its use as a grotto in the 19th century. The visible remains suggested a souterrain, but the absence of records of these in south-west Scotland make this unlikely. The passage is lined with corbelled drystone walling, roofed with capstones, and leads into the natural cave section which may have been formed by wave action as it shows a water-scoure created by wave action. Some areas of undisturbed stratified deposits have been found, together with evidence of occupation, such as a hearth, bones, and a fragment of glass.

== Transport ==
=== Railways ===
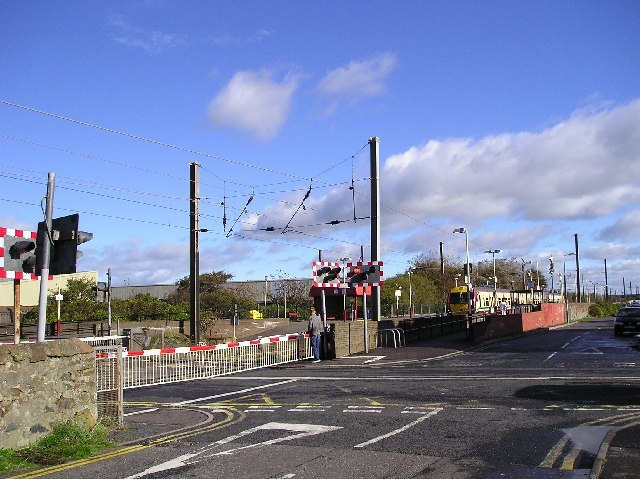
Stevenston railway station

In 1840, Stevenston received its first railway station, Stevenston, on the line travelling from Ardrossan to Glasgow. In 1888, a second railway station, Stevenston Moorpark, was opened on the new Lanarkshire and Ayrshire Railway; however, this line had a short life span and the station closed in 1932. At one point, a third railway station, Ardeer Platform, was in operation just south of the town serving the Nobel factory; however, it closed in 1966. The first station is still in operation today.

=== Canals ===
The Stevenston Canal of 1772 was the first commercial canal in Scotland. The canal was 2 miles (3 kilometres) long, had no locks, was 12 feet (3.7 metres) wide and had a depth of 4 ft (1.2 m), with much of its cut following the old course of the sea channel, a relic of the days when Ardeer was an island. A number of branches were cut to reach the coal pits and the Master Gott is thought to be the last remaining vestige. Coal was carried on barges and the waste was dumped along the route to act as a wind break as blown sand being a recurring problem. Water was supplied via a dam on the Stevenston Burn. The coal was carried from the canal end to the waiting boats on a railway, there being no direct physical link with the harbour.

== Industry ==
=== Mining and quarrying ===
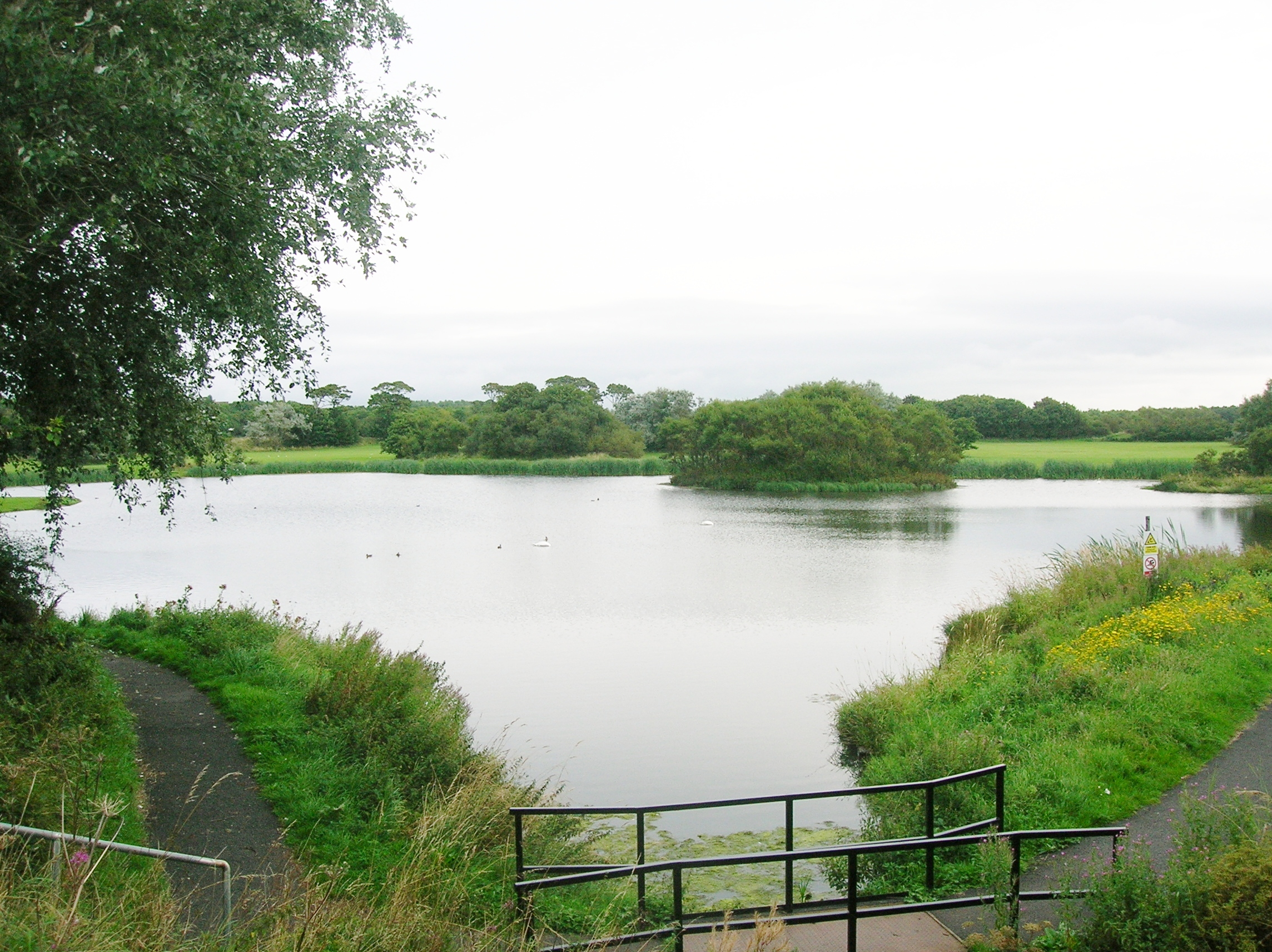
The flooded Ardeer Quarry.

The town became a coal mining centre with thirty-two mines recorded on the Ardeer Estate when it was sold to the Rev Patrick Warner in 1707. The pits were mostly exhausted by the end of the 19th century, the last, Ardeer East, closing in 1926.

Stevenston Stone was a high quality white sandstone, marble-like, quarried from about 1800 and popular in places such as Dublin and Belfast. The site was allowed to flood in 1920; it was 150 to 200 ft (50 to 60 m) deep, connected to old mine workings which provided a steady and substantial water flow which has to be pumped out continuously to prevent flooding. Ballast and other material from the old Caledonian Railway embankment nearby was used to infill much of the old quarry.

The Parkend Quarry produced 'Osmond Stone' which as a form of whinstone was very heat resistant and was used in ovens, furnace linings, etc. The Wand House was located near to the Master Gott. Wand's are willow rods and these were used to make the creels in which mined coal was once carried. The site is now a public park.

=== The Stevenston Ironworks ===
In 1849 the Glengarnock Iron Company built five blast furnaces on the foreshore of the Ardeer sands to smelt pig-iron. The iron ore was imported through Ardrossan harbour and to reduce costs Merry and Cunningham Ltd., successors to the Glengarnock company, started to build a quay by dumping slag into the sea. After 300 yards of these works had been completed it became obvious that no ship could safely dock here given the force of winter storms. The quay was abandoned and to this day it is known as the 'old pier' or 'slag point'. The works closed in 1931 and were demolished in 1935.

=== Explosives ===
In the 20th century, the town was a major base for Nobel Industries and later ICI, whose Ardeer site employed many thousands of workers producing explosives and chemicals. ICI added a nylon plant in the 1960s which had a short lived production life, and a nitric acid plant. The closure of these facilities, along with the general decline in ICI's presence in the town has had a devastating long-term effect on the town's economy. The site is now owned by Inabata, a Japanese trading firm, and operates as Nobel Enterprises. The energetic technologies side of the business is now owned by Chemring Ltd, with the nitrocellulose manufacture retained under Nobel Enterprises.

To the south of Stevenston, on the border of the Nobel Plant, sits the South African Pavilion. Known locally as Africa House, this building was once part of the Empire Exhibition, Scotland 1938 in Bellahouston Park, Glasgow. The pavilion was rebuilt at Ardeer after the end of the exhibition and served as the staff restaurant for many years. The building now lays derelict and in disrepair, having suffered vandalism and extensive fire damage.

On 8 September 2007, a major fire was reported at the Nobel site when 1500-1700 tons of nitrocellulose, stored in an open area, caught fire. There was little property damage and no serious injuries.

== Education ==
=== Secondary schools ===
- Auchenharvie Academy

=== Primary schools ===
- Ardeer Primary School
- Glencairn Primary School
- Hayocks Primary School
- Saint John's Roman Catholic Primary School

== Famous residents ==
- Gordon Smith, footballer
- Des Browne, former Secretary of State for Defence and Secretary of State for Scotland
- Andy Auld, former footballer
- Grado, professional wrestler and actor on Two Doors Down, Scot Squad, and presenter of Scotland's Greatest Escape

== Local amenities ==
Stevenston Beach local nature reserve and the Ardeer Quarry parklands are open to the general public and visitors at all times. The NAC Ranger Service regularly patrols these sites.

== See also ==
- Auchenharvie
- Ardeer Thistle F.C., football club
- The Lands of Ashgrove, previously known as Ashenyards.
- North Ayrshire Wild, ice hockey club
- Piperheugh
- Ayrshire Coastal Path
