= Stevenston railway station =

Railway station in North Ayrshire, Scotland

Stevenston Scottish Gaelic: Baile Steaphain
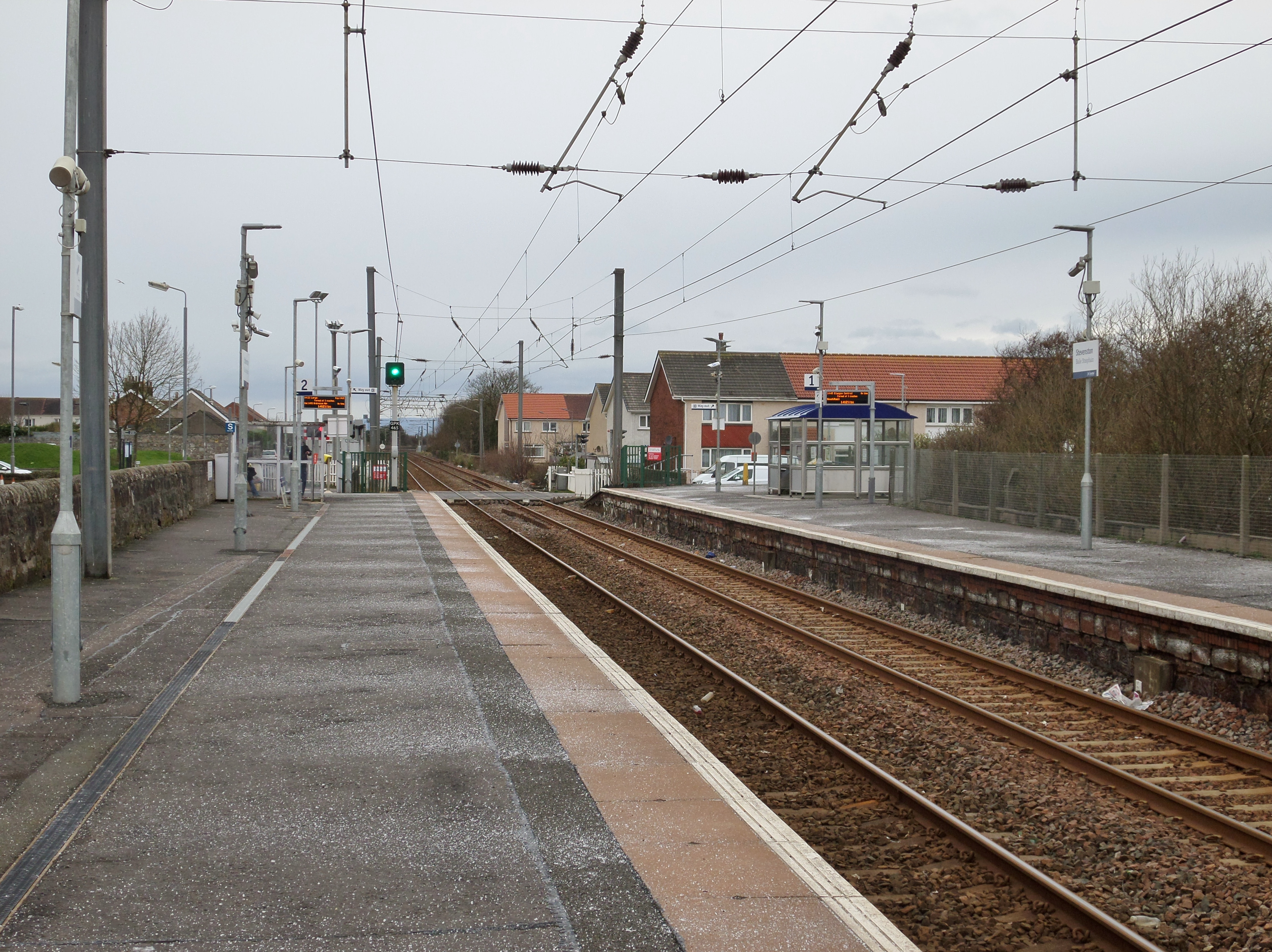
- View west towards Saltcoats

General information
- Location: Stevenston, North Ayrshire; Scotland
- Coordinates: 55.6343°N 4.7499°W
- Grid reference: NS269412
- Manager: ScotRail
- Transit authority: SPT
- Platforms: 2

Other information
- Station code: STV

History
- Original company: Ardrossan Railway
- Pre-grouping: Glasgow and South Western Railway
- Post-grouping: LMS

Key dates
- 27 July 1840: Opened

Passengers
- 2021/22: ▲63,404
- 2022/23: ▲82,236
- 2023/24: ▲97,974
- 2024/25: ▲99,624
- 2025/26: ▲0.104 million
Location
Notes
- Passenger statistics from the Office of Rail and Road

Stevenston railway station is a railway station serving the town of Stevenston, North Ayrshire, Scotland. The station is managed by ScotRail and is owned by Network Rail. It is on the Ayrshire Coast Line, 29 miles (47 km) south west of Glasgow Central.

== History ==
The station was opened on 27 July 1840 by the Ardrossan Railway. The station once included several buildings, a passenger footbridge and a level crossing. A chord line to "Dubs Junction" on the Glasgow, Paisley, Kilmarnock and Ayr Railway route towards Irvine was used by an Ardrossan to Irvine & Kilmarnock service until April 1964, when it fell victim to the Beeching cuts. The chord remains open and in regular use by freight trains heading from the Hunterston deep water import terminal towards Ayr & the G&SWR line to Mauchline (and hence to Dumfries and the WCML at Carlisle).

Today the level crossing is still in operation, the footbridge has been removed and basic shelters now serve the platforms.

== Services ==
Monday to Saturday daytimes there is a half-hourly service eastbound to Glasgow Central and hourly westbound to Largs and Ardrossan Harbour respectively.

On Sundays there is an hourly service eastbound to Glasgow Central and westbound to Largs, plus a limited additional service to Ardrossan Harbour to connect with the ferry sailings to Brodick.

Preceding station	National Rail	Following station
Saltcoats	ScotRail; Ayrshire Coast Line	Kilwinning
	Historical railways	
Saltcoats; Line and station open	Glasgow and South Western Railway; Ardrossan Railway	Kilwinning; Line and station open
Connection with Ardrossan Railway at Byrehill Junction	Glasgow and South Western Railway; Glasgow, Paisley, Kilmarnock and Ayr Railway	Bogside; Link open (freight only); station closed
Connection with Ardrossan Railway	Glasgow and South Western Railway; Nobel Line	Ardeer Platform; Line and station closed
