= Ardrossan railway station =

Ardrossan railway station can refer to one of several railway stations in the town of Ardrossan, North Ayrshire, Scotland:

- Ardrossan Harbour railway station
- Ardrossan South Beach railway station
- Ardrossan Town railway station
- Ardrossan Montgomerie Pier railway station (closed)
- Ardrossan North railway station (closed)
- Ardrossan Winton Pier railway station (closed)
