= West Kilbride railway station =

Railway station in North Ayrshire, Scotland

West Kilbride Scottish Gaelic: Cille Bhrìghde an Iar
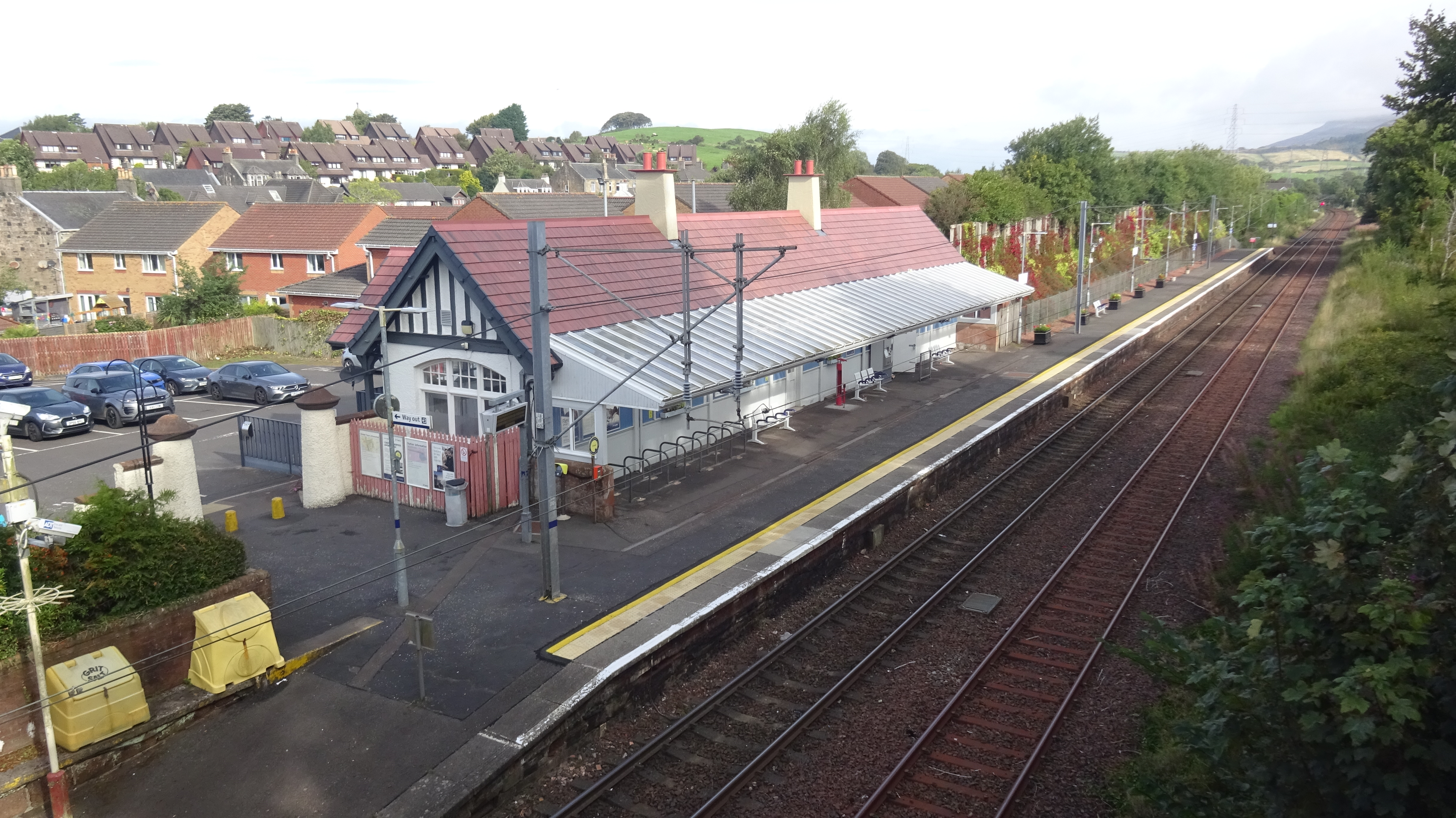

General information
- Location: West Kilbride, North Ayrshire; Scotland
- Coordinates: 55.6967°N 4.8514°W
- Grid reference: NS208484
- Manager: ScotRail
- Transit authority: Strathclyde Partnership for Transport
- Platforms: 1

Other information
- Station code: WKB

History
- Original company: G&SWR Largs Branch
- Post-grouping: LMS

Key dates
- 1 May 1878: Opened

Passengers
- 2021/22: ▲78,254
- 2022/23: ▲0.111 million
- 2023/24: ▲0.125 million
- 2024/25: ▲0.127 million
- 2025/26: ▼0.126 million

Listed Building – Category B
- Designated: 17 February 1989
- Reference no.: LB14312
Location
Notes
- Passenger statistics from the Office of Rail and Road

West Kilbride railway station is a railway station that serves the village of West Kilbride, North Ayrshire, Scotland. The station is managed by ScotRail and is on the Ayrshire Coast Line.

== History ==
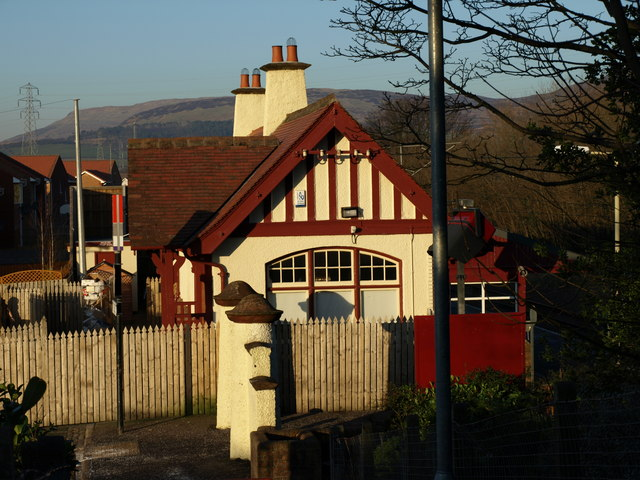
The former station building

The station was opened on 1 May 1878 by the Glasgow and South Western Railway as part of the extension of the former Ardrossan Railway to Largs. The present station building was designed in 1900 by the noted architect James Miller. A camping coach was positioned here by the Scottish Region from 1954 to 1957, two coaches were here in 1964 and three from 1965 to 1967.

Originally a two platform station, the southbound platform was demolished as part of the electrification works in 1985. The former northbound line (to Largs) is electrified and signalled for bi-directional working, being used by passenger trains for both directions, and by northbound freight trains to the Hunterston Terminal. The former southbound track is signalled for southbound working only and is not electrified, being used by southbound trains from Hunterston.

The station building still stands but is no longer used as part of the station itself. In July 2021, it was renovated as part of plans to become a bar.

== Services ==
An hourly service operates in each direction off-peak on weekdays and all weekend, northbound to Largs and southbound to Ardrossan South Beach, Kilwinning and then on to Glasgow Central. Some extra trains run at peak times. Typical journey times to Glasgow are 48–54 minutes (depending on stopping pattern).

Preceding station	National Rail	Following station
Fairlie	ScotRail; Ayrshire Coast Line	Ardrossan South Beach
	Historical railways	
Fairlie; Line and station open	Glasgow and South Western Railway; Largs Branch	Ardrossan South Beach; Line and station open
Fairlie; Line and station open	Glasgow and South Western Railway; Largs Branch	Ardrossan Town; Line closed, station open

== Bibliography ==
- Brailsford, Martyn, ed. (December 2017) [1987]. Railway Track Diagrams 1: Scotland & Isle of Man (6th ed.). Frome: Trackmaps. ISBN 978-0-9549866-9-8.
- Butt, R. V. J. (October 1995). The Directory of Railway Stations: details every public and private passenger station, halt, platform and stopping place, past and present (1st ed.). Sparkford: Patrick Stephens Ltd. ISBN 978-1-85260-508-7. OCLC 60251199. OL 11956311M.
- McRae, Andrew (1998). British Railways Camping Coach Holidays: A Tour of Britain in the 1950s and 1960s. Vol. Scenes from the Past: 30 (Part Two). Foxline. ISBN 1-870119-53-3.
