= Ardrossan Town railway station =

Railway station in North Ayrshire, Scotland

Ardrossan Town Scottish Gaelic: Baile Àird Rosain

General information
- Location: Ardrossan, North Ayrshire; Scotland
- Coordinates: 55.6402°N 4.8122°W
- Grid reference: NS230420
- Manager: ScotRail
- Transit authority: SPT
- Platforms: 1

Other information
- Station code: ADN

History
- Original company: Ardrossan Railway
- Pre-grouping: Glasgow and South Western Railway
- Post-grouping: LMS

Key dates
- 1831: Opened as Ardrossan
- 2 March 1953: Renamed Ardrossan Town
- 1 January 1968: Closed
- 19 January 1987: Reopened

Passengers
- 2021/22: ▲10,928
- 2022/23: ▲14,082
- 2023/24: ▲17,304
- 2024/25: ▼17,108
- 2025/26: ▲19,092
Location
Notes
- Passenger statistics from the Office of Rail and Road

Ardrossan Town railway station is one of three remaining in the town of Ardrossan, North Ayrshire, Scotland. It is one of the oldest operational railway stations in Ayrshire, although services and facilities are severely cut back from the station's peak in the early 20th century. The station is currently managed by ScotRail and is on the Ayrshire Coast Line.

== History ==
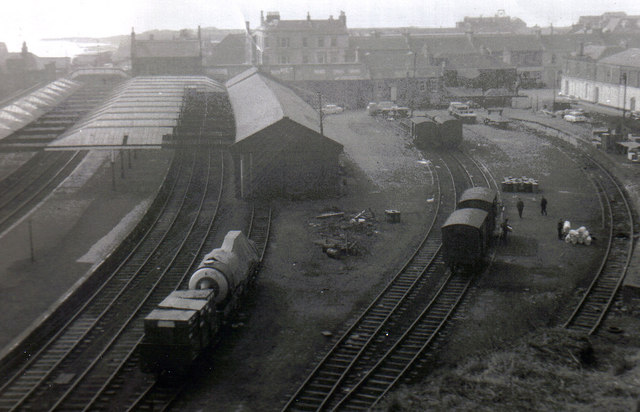
Ardrossan Town in 1968

The station was opened in 1831 by the Ardrossan Railway and was simply known as Ardrossan. The original station had two side platforms and although it was a terminus at first it became an intermediate station upon the opening of Ardrossan Pier railway station in 1840. The station was rebuilt some time around 1890,

It became part of the Glasgow and South Western Railway, passing to the London, Midland and Scottish Railway during the Grouping of 1923. The station then passed on to the Scottish Region of British Railways on nationalisation in 1948 and was renamed Ardrossan Town by British Rail on 2 March 1953.

The rebuilt station consisted of two through lines with the addition of a bay platform at the north end. A goods shed and yard were located to the west of the platforms. The main offices were located on the Up platform, consisting of a one and two storey ashlar building. The station was closed on 1 January 1968 and lay derelict for a number of years, though the double tracks into the bay platform remained and were used for stabling empty DMUs from time to time.

Upon electrification of the Ayrshire Coast Line, the station was reopened on 19 January 1987, now unstaffed and on a far smaller scale: the double track to the harbour was singled and the Up platform removed, meaning trains from both directions would now have to use the former Down platform. The station buildings remained unused but were later refurbished for use as commercial properties and the branch lines into the bay platform at the station were lifted. In the early 2000s, the surviving station office buildings were demolished and replaced by a contemporary red-brick commercial unit. The goods shed remains as private property.

== Services ==
Monday to Saturdays there is an hourly service to and from Glasgow Central, with most services continuing to Ardrossan Harbour to connect with the ferry service to Brodick on the Isle of Arran. A couple of services from Glasgow also start/terminate here instead of Ardrossan Harbour.

On Sundays, There is a limited service of (5 arrivals & 4 departures) to connect with the ferry to Brodick.

Preceding station	National Rail	Following station
Ardrossan Harbour	ScotRail; Ayrshire Coast Line	Ardrossan South Beach
	Historical railways	
Connection with Ardrossan Railway	Glasgow and South Western Railway; Largs Branch	West Kilbride; Link closed; station open
Ardrossan Winton Pier; Line open; station closed	Glasgow and South Western Railway; Ardrossan Railway	Ardrossan South Beach; Line and station open
