= Ardrossan South Beach railway station =

Railway station in North Ayrshire, Scotland

Ardrossan South Beach Scottish Gaelic: Tràigh a Deas Àird Rosain
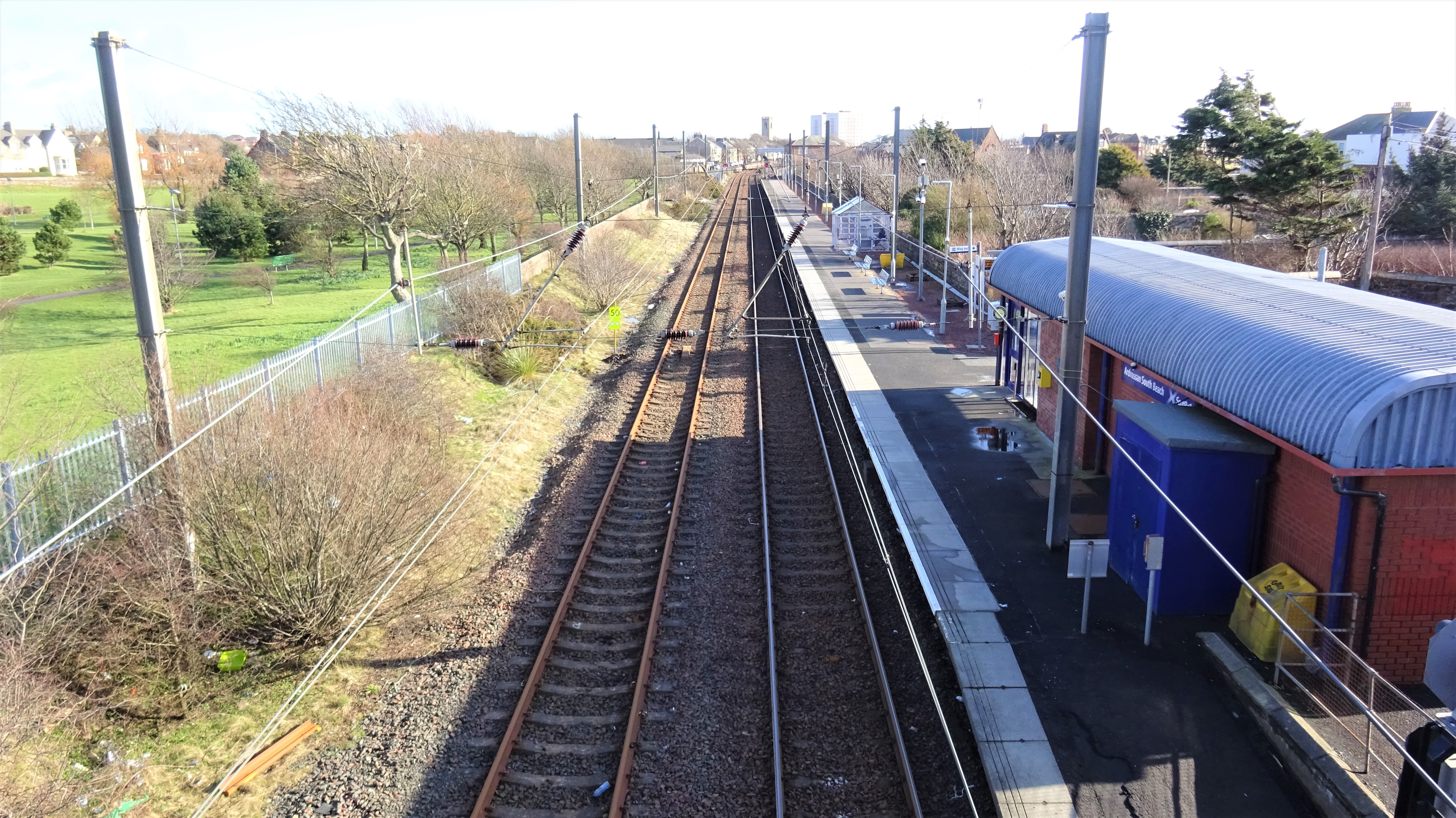

General information
- Location: Ardrossan, North Ayrshire; Scotland
- Coordinates: 55.6410°N 4.8001°W
- Grid reference: NS238421
- Manager: ScotRail
- Transit authority: SPT
- Platforms: 1

Other information
- Station code: ASB

History
- Original company: Ardrossan Railway
- Pre-grouping: Glasgow and South Western Railway
- Post-grouping: LMS

Key dates
- 1 January 1883: Opened

Passengers
- 2021/22: ▲0.119 million
- Interchange: ▲112
- 2022/23: ▲0.143 million
- Interchange: ▲284
- 2023/24: ▲0.172 million
- Interchange: ▲314
- 2024/25: ▼0.167 million
- Interchange: ▼258
- 2025/26: ▲0.169 million
- Interchange: ▼218
Location
Notes
- Passenger statistics from the Office of Rail and Road

Ardrossan South Beach railway station is one of three in the town of Ardrossan, North Ayrshire, Scotland. The station is managed by ScotRail and is on the Ayrshire Coast Line.

== History ==
The station was opened on 1 January 1883 by the Glasgow and South Western Railway, during the extension of the former Ardrossan Railway to Largs. It became part of the London, Midland & Scottish Railway during the Grouping of 1923. The station then passed on to the Scottish Region of British Railways on nationalisation in 1948.

When sectorisation was introduced in the 1980s, the station was served by ScotRail until the privatisation of British Rail.

Originally a two side platform station, the eastbound platform was demolished in 1987, with passenger trains for both directions now using the westbound platform. The eastbound track remains and is used for freight (mainly to and from Hunterston Terminal). A ticket office is still present at this station and is staffed for most services. The short (1 mile/1.6 km) branch line to Ardrossan Harbour diverges just to the northwest at Holm Junction, providing rail access to the ferry terminal used by the Caledonian MacBrayne sailings to the Isle of Arran.

There were locomotive sheds just slightly to the west of the station, built in 1881. This was a fairly large complex including offices, stores and workshops and employed over 300 people at its peak. The succession of diesel engines over steam led to the sheds' demise, and they were demolished in 1975. A single siding is in place at the site.

In 2016, Network Rail was fined £130,000 for a worker suffering catastrophic injuries while repairing an overhead line at the station.

== Facilities ==
The station has a small car park (23 spaces) and ticket office staffed seven days a week.

== Services ==
Preceding station	National Rail	Following station
West Kilbride	ScotRail; Ayrshire Coast Line	Saltcoats
Ardrossan Town	ScotRail; Ayrshire Coast Line	Saltcoats
	Historical railways	
West Kilbride; Line and station open	Glasgow and South Western Railway; Largs Branch	Connection with Ardrossan Railway
Ardrossan Town; Line and station open	Glasgow and South Western Railway; Ardrossan Railway	Saltcoats; Line and station open

=== 2009 ===
On Monday to Saturdays, there is a half-hourly service eastbound to Glasgow Central and an hourly service westbound to both Ardrossan Town and Largs. Since 2009, most Ardrossan Town services have been extended to Ardrossan Harbour, where there are ferry connections to Brodick on the Isle of Arran.

On Sundays, there is usually an hourly service towards Glasgow Central and Largs with extra services to Ardrossan Harbour, connecting with the ferry.

=== From December 2011 ===
- 2 trains per hour to Glasgow Central
- 1 train per hour to Largs (with peak hour extras)
- 1 train per hour to Ardrossan Harbour. Some services are timed to coincide with the Caledonian MacBrayne ferry service to Brodick on the Isle of Arran.

On Sundays, there are usually hourly services towards Glasgow Central and Largs, with five services to Ardrossan Harbour connecting with the ferry.
