= UK railway stations – S =

| Station name | Postcode links to map of station at Bing Maps | Station code links to arrivals and departures | Station code links to station information |
|---|---|---|---|
| St Albans Abbey | AL1 3TF | SAA | SAA |
| St Albans City | AL1 2PS | SAC | SAC |
| St Andrews Road | BS11 9HP | SAR | SAR |
| St Annes-on-the-Sea | FY8 2AS | SAS | SAS |
| St Austell | PL25 4LA | SAU | SAU |
| St Bees | CA27 0DN | SBS | SBS |
| St Budeaux Ferry Road | PL5 1YA | SBF | SBF |
| St Budeaux Victoria Road | PL5 1NB | SBV | SBV |
| St Columb Road | TR9 6QP | SCR | SCR |
| St Denys | SO17 2HW | SDN | SDN |
| St Erth | TR27 6JL | SER | SER |
| St Germans | PL12 5LU | SGM | SGM |
| St Helens Central | WA10 1DG | SNH | SNH |
| St Helens Junction | WA9 3LA | SHJ | SHJ |
| St. Helier | SM4 5NR | SIH | SIH |
| St Ives | TR26 2EQ | SIV | SIV |
| St James' Park | EX4 6QG | SJP | SJP |
| St. James Street | E17 7PB | SJS | SJS |
| St Johns | SE8 4EW | SAJ | SAJ |
| St Keyne Wishing Well Halt | PL14 4SH | SKN | SKN |
| St Leonards Warrior Square | TN38 0AZ | SLQ | SLQ |
| St Margarets (Herts) | SG12 8DS | SMT | SMT |
| St Margarets (London) | TW1 1RH | SMG | SMG |
| St Mary Cray | BR5 2NB | SMY | SMY |
| St Michaels | L17 7DR | STM | STM |
| St Neots | PE19 1QF | SNO | SNO |
| Salford Central | M3 5ET | SFD | SFD |
| Salford Crescent | M5 4BR | SLD | SLD |
| Salfords | RH1 5JL | SAF | SAF |
| Salhouse | NR13 6NZ | SAH | SAH |
| Salisbury | SP2 7RS | SAL | SAL |
| Saltaire | BD18 4PS | SAE | SAE |
| Saltash | PL12 4DR | STS | STS |
| Saltburn | TS12 1AQ | SLB | SLB |
| Saltcoats | KA21 5JT | SLT | SLT |
| Saltmarshe | DN14 7TW | SAM | SAM |
| Salwick | PR4 0YH | SLW | SLW |
| Sandal and Agbrigg | WF1 5AF | SNA | SNA |
| Sandbach | CW11 3GD | SDB | SDB |
| Sanderstead | CR2 0YY | SNR | SNR |
| Sandhills | L5 9XJ | SDL | SDL |
| Sandhurst | GU47 9DX | SND | SND |
| Sandling | CT21 4HH | SDG | SDG |
| Sandown | PO36 9EU | SAN | SAN |
| Sandplace | PL13 1PJ | SDP | SDP |
| Sandwell and Dudley | B70 7JD | SAD | SAD |
| Sandwich | CT13 9RA | SDW | SDW |
| Sandy | SG19 1AW | SDY | SDY |
| Sankey | WA5 3DA | SNK | SNK |
| Sanquhar | DG4 6BS | SQH | SQH |
| Sarn | CF32 9NB | SRR | SRR |
| Saundersfoot | SA69 9BG | SDF | SDF |
| Saunderton | HP14 4HT | SDR | SDR |
| Sawbridgeworth | CM21 9JZ | SAW | SAW |
| Saxilby | LN1 2PX | SXY | SXY |
| Saxmundham | IP17 1BW | SAX | SAX |
| Scarborough | YO11 1TN | SCA | SCA |
| Scarva | BT63 6JY | | |
| Scotscalder | KW12 6XJ | SCT | SCT |
| Scotstounhill | G13 1UY | SCH | SCH |
| Scunthorpe | DN16 1TL | SCU | SCU |
| Sea Mills | BS9 1EA | SML | SML |
| Seaford | BN25 2AR | SEF | SEF |
| Seaforth and Litherland | L21 3TE | SFL | SFL |
| Seaham | SR7 0AD | SEA | SEA |
| Seahill | BT18 0DS | | |
| Seamer | YO12 4UB | SEM | SEM |
| Seascale | CA20 1QU | SSC | SSC |
| Seaton Carew | TS25 2AG | SEC | SEC |
| Seaton Delaval | NE25 0QX | SEJ | SEJ |
| Seer Green and Jordans | HP9 2UR | SRG | SRG |
| Selby | YO8 4NP | SBY | SBY |
| Selhurst | SE25 5EG | SRS | SRS |
| Sellafield | CA20 1RG | SEL | SEL |
| Selling | ME13 9PW | SEG | SEG |
| Selly Oak | B29 6DP | SLY | SLY |
| Settle | BD24 9BL | SET | SET |
| Seven Kings | IG3 8BG | SVK | SVK |
| Seven Sisters | N15 5DR | SVS | SVS |
| Sevenoaks | TN13 2JA | SEV | SEV |
| Severn Beach | BS35 4QD | SVB | SVB |
| Severn Tunnel Junction | NP26 3UN | STJ | STJ |
| Shadwell | E1 2QF | SDE | SDE |
| Shalford | GU4 8BZ | SFR | SFR |
| Shanklin | PO37 7AR | SHN | SHN |
| Shawfair | EH22 1SB | SFI | SFI |
| Shawford | SO21 2BN | SHW | SHW |
| Shawlands | G41 3SW | SHL | SHL |
| Sheerness-on-Sea | ME12 1RJ | SSS | SSS |
| Sheffield | S1 2BP | SHF | SHF |
| Shelford | CB2 5NE | SED | SED |
| Shenfield | CM15 8JE | SNF | SNF |
| Shenstone | WS14 0NW | SEN | SEN |
| Shepherd's Bush | W12 7JD | SPB | SPB |
| Shepherds Well | CT15 7PE | SPH | SPH |
| Shepley | HD8 8DX | SPY | SPY |
| Shepperton | TW17 8DN | SHP | SHP |
| Shepreth | SG8 6PZ | STH | STH |
| Sherborne | DT9 3NB | SHE | SHE |
| Sherburn-in-Elmet | LS25 6EP | SIE | SIE |
| Sheringham | NR26 8RG | SHM | SHM |
| Shettleston | G32 0PF | SLS | SLS |
| Shieldmuir | ML2 7TQ | SDM | SDM |
| Shifnal | TF11 9AX | SFN | SFN |
| Shildon | DL4 2DQ | SHD | SHD |
| Shiplake | RG9 3NU | SHI | SHI |
| Shipley | BD18 2JL | SHY | SHY |
| Shippea Hill | CB7 4SP | SPP | SPP |
| Shipton | OX7 6BH | SIP | SIP |
| Shirebrook | NG20 8SU | SHB | SHB |
| Shirehampton | BS11 9XB | SHH | SHH |
| Shireoaks | S81 8LW | SRO | SRO |
| Shirley | B90 1AB | SRL | SRL |
| Shoeburyness | SS3 9AW | SRY | SRY |
| Sholing | SO19 9RD | SHO | SHO |
| Shoreditch High Street | E1 6AE | SDC | SDC |
| Shoreham | TN14 7RT | SEH | SEH |
| Shoreham-by-Sea | BN43 5WX | SSE | SSE |
| Shortlands | BR2 0JA | SRT | SRT |
| Shotton | CH5 1DL | SHT | SHT |
| Shotts | ML7 4BH | SHS | SHS |
| Shrewsbury | SY1 2HR | SHR | SHR |
| Sidcup | DA15 7AG | SID | SID |
| Sileby | LE12 7NA | SIL | SIL |
| Silecroft | LA18 4NS | SIC | SIC |
| Silkstone Common | S75 3JJ | SLK | SLK |
| Silver Street | N18 2UA | SLV | SLV |
| Silverdale | LA5 0SP | SVR | SVR |
| Singer | G81 2JQ | SIN | SIN |
| Sittingbourne | ME10 3ED | SIT | SIT |
| Skegness | PE25 3QN | SKG | SKG |
| Skewen | SA10 6HB | SKE | SKE |
| Skipton | BD23 2DG | SKI | SKI |
| Slade Green | DA8 2NX | SGR | SGR |
| Slaithwaite | HD7 5EF | SWT | SWT |
| Slateford | EH14 1PZ | SLA | SLA |
| Sleaford | NG34 7RG | SLR | SLR |
| Sleights | YO21 1RU | SLH | SLH |
| Slough | SL2 5BY | SLO | SLO |
| Small Heath | B10 0EW | SMA | SMA |
| Smallbrook Junction | PO33 4BE | SAB | SAB |
| Smethwick Galton Bridge | B66 1HU | SGB | SGB |
| Smethwick Rolfe Street | B66 2AA | SMR | SMR |
| Smithy Bridge | OL15 8QQ | SMB | SMB |
| Snaith | DN14 9HY | SNI | SNI |
| Snodland | ME6 5AR | SDA | SDA |
| Snowdown | CT15 4JL | SWO | SWO |
| Soham | CB7 5JN | SOJ | SOJ |
| Sole Street | DA13 0XY | SOR | SOR |
| Solihull | B91 1LG | SOL | SOL |
| Somerleyton | NR32 5QN | SYT | SYT |
| South Acton | W3 8TR | SAT | SAT |
| South Bank | TS6 6AN | SBK | SBK |
| South Bermondsey | SE16 3JZ | SBM | SBM |
| South Croydon | CR2 7DW | SCY | SCY |
| South Elmsall | WF9 2HU | SES | SES |
| South Greenford | UB6 8EL | SGN | SGN |
| South Gyle | EH12 7XH | SGL | SGL |
| South Hampstead | NW8 0DR | SOH | SOH |
| South Kenton | HA9 8QS | SOK | SOK |
| South Merton | SW20 9JT | SMO | SMO |
| South Milford | LS25 6AA | SOM | SOM |
| South Ruislip | HA4 6TP | SRU | SRU |
| South Tottenham | N15 6UL | STO | STO |
| South Wigston | LE18 4XZ | SWS | SWS |
| South Woodham Ferrers | CM3 5NQ | SOF | SOF |
| Southall | UB1 3AD | STL | STL |
| Southampton Airport Parkway | SO18 2HW | SOA | SOA |
| Southampton Central | SO15 1GP | SOU | SOU |
| Southbourne | PO10 8LW | SOB | SOB |
| Southbury | EN3 4HW | SBU | SBU |
| Southease | BN8 6JS | SEE | SEE |
| Southend Airport | SS2 6YF | SIA | SIA |
| Southend Central | SS1 1AH | SOC | SOC |
| Southend East | SS1 2QY | SOE | SOE |
| Southend Victoria | SS2 6AE | SOV | SOV |
| Southminster | CM0 7EN | SMN | SMN |
| Southport | PR8 1BE | SOP | SOP |
| Southwick | BN42 4DD | SWK | SWK |
| Sowerby Bridge | HX6 3LA | SOW | SOW |
| Spalding | PE11 1EY | SPA | SPA |
| Spean Bridge | PH34 4ER | SBR | SBR |
| Spital | CH63 9NE | SPI | SPI |
| Spondon | DE21 7NE | SPO | SPO |
| Spooner Row | NR18 9JR | SPN | SPN |
| Spring Road | B11 3DP | SRI | SRI |
| Springburn | G21 4TP | SPR | SPR |
| Springfield | KY15 5RT | SPF | SPF |
| Squires Gate | FY8 2SN | SQU | SQU |
| Stafford | ST16 2AA | STA | STA |
| Staines | TW18 2BZ | SNS | SNS |
| Stallingborough | DN41 8AS | SLL | SLL |
| Stalybridge | SK15 1RH | SYB | SYB |
| Stamford | PE9 2JN | SMD | SMD |
| Stamford Hill | N15 6PP | SMH | SMH |
| Stanford-le-Hope | SS17 0JX | SFO | SFO |
| Stanlow and Thornton | CH2 4NW | SNT | SNT |
| Stansted Airport | CM24 1RG | SSD | SSD |
| Stansted Mountfitchet | CM24 8BH | SST | SST |
| Staplehurst | TN12 0QR | SPU | SPU |
| Stapleton Road | BS5 0LJ | SRD | SRD |
| Starbeck | HG1 4PY | SBE | SBE |
| Starcross | EX6 8NY | SCS | SCS |
| Staveley | LA8 9NB | SVL | SVL |
| Stechford | B33 8AJ | SCF | SCF |
| Steeton and Silsden | BD20 6RZ | SON | SON |
| Stepps | G33 6HG | SPS | SPS |
| Stevenage | SG1 1XT | SVG | SVG |
| Stevenston | KA20 3LB | STV | STV |
| Stewartby | MK43 9LY | SWR | SWR |
| Stewarton | KA3 5BE | STT | STT |
| Stirling | FK8 2BY | STG | STG |
| Stockport | SK3 9HZ | SPT | SPT |
| Stocksfield | NE43 7NH | SKS | SKS |
| Stocksmoor | HD4 6XN | SSM | SSM |
| Stockton | TS18 2AZ | STK | STK |
| Stoke Mandeville | HP22 5UH | SKM | SKM |
| Stoke Newington | N16 6YB | SKW | SKW |
| Stoke-on-Trent | ST4 2AB | SOT | SOT |
| Stone | ST15 8LH | SNE | SNE |
| Stone Crossing | DA9 9AR | SCG | SCG |
| Stonebridge Park | NW10 0RL | SBP | SBP |
| Stonegate | TN5 7ER | SOG | SOG |
| Stonehaven | AB39 2NE | STN | STN |
| Stonehouse | GL10 2QF | SHU | SHU |
| Stoneleigh | KT19 0QZ | SNL | SNL |
| Stourbridge Junction | DY9 0YQ | SBJ | SBJ |
| Stourbridge Town | DY8 1EX | SBT | SBT |
| Stow | TD1 2SQ | SOI | SOI |
| Stowmarket | IP14 5AS | SMK | SMK |
| Stranraer | DG9 8EJ | STR | STR |
| Stratford | E15 1AZ | SRA | SRA |
| Stratford International | E20 1YY | SFA | SFA |
| Stratford-upon-Avon | CV37 6PL | SAV | SAV |
| Stratford-upon-Avon Parkway | CV37 9QY | STY | STY |
| Strathcarron | IV54 8YR | STC | STC |
| Strawberry Hill | TW2 5TF | STW | STW |
| Streatham | SW16 6JJ | STE | STE |
| Streatham Common | SW16 5TF | SRC | SRC |
| Streatham Hill | SW2 4PA | SRH | SRH |
| Streethouse | WF7 6BY | SHC | SHC |
| Strines | SK22 3AL | SRN | SRN |
| Stromeferry | IV53 8UJ | STF | STF |
| Strood | ME2 4BG | SOO | SOO |
| Stroud | GL5 3AG | STD | STD |
| Sturry | CT2 0BH | STU | STU |
| Styal | SK9 4JW | SYA | SYA |
| Sudbury | CO10 2SU | SUY | SUY |
| Sudbury & Harrow Road | HA0 2NB | SUD | SUD |
| Sudbury Hill Harrow | HA1 3PJ | SDH | SDH |
| Sugar Loaf | LD5 4RP | SUG | SUG |
| Summerston | G20 0HY | SUM | SUM |
| Sunbury | TW16 6SA | SUU | SUU |
| Sunderland | SR1 3HR | SUN | SUN |
| Sundridge Park | BR1 3TR | SUP | SUP |
| Sunningdale | SL5 0EL | SNG | SNG |
| Sunnymeads | TW19 5HD | SNY | SNY |
| Surbiton | KT6 4PE | SUR | SUR |
| Surrey Quays | SE16 2UF | SQE | SQE |
| Sutton Coldfield | B73 6AY | SUT | SUT |
| Sutton Common | SM1 3HZ | SUC | SUC |
| Sutton | SM1 1JA | SUO | SUO |
| Sutton Parkway | NG17 5LG | SPK | SPK |
| Swale | ME9 8SS | SWL | SWL |
| Swanley | BR8 8HP | SAY | SAY |
| Swanscombe | DA10 0LG | SWM | SWM |
| Swansea | SA1 1NU | SWA | SWA |
| Swanwick | SO31 1FQ | SNW | SNW |
| Sway | SO41 6AZ | SWY | SWY |
| Swaythling | SO18 2LB | SWG | SWG |
| Swinderby | LN6 9HY | SWD | SWD |
| Swindon | SN1 1DQ | SWI | SWI |
| Swineshead | PE20 3PT | SWE | SWE |
| Swinton (Greater Manchester) | M27 6HD | SNN | SNN |
| Swinton (South Yorkshire) | S64 8AS | SWN | SWN |
| Sydenham Hill | SE21 7ND | SYH | SYH |
| Sydenham (Belfast) | BT3 9YD | | |
| Sydenham (London) | SE26 4LE | SYD | SYD |
| Syon Lane | TW7 5JG | SYL | SYL |
| Syston | LE7 1NZ | SYS | SYS |

== See also ==
- List of closed railway stations in Britain
- List of heritage railway stations in the United Kingdom
