= Saltcoats railway station =

Railway station in North Ayrshire, Scotland

Saltcoats
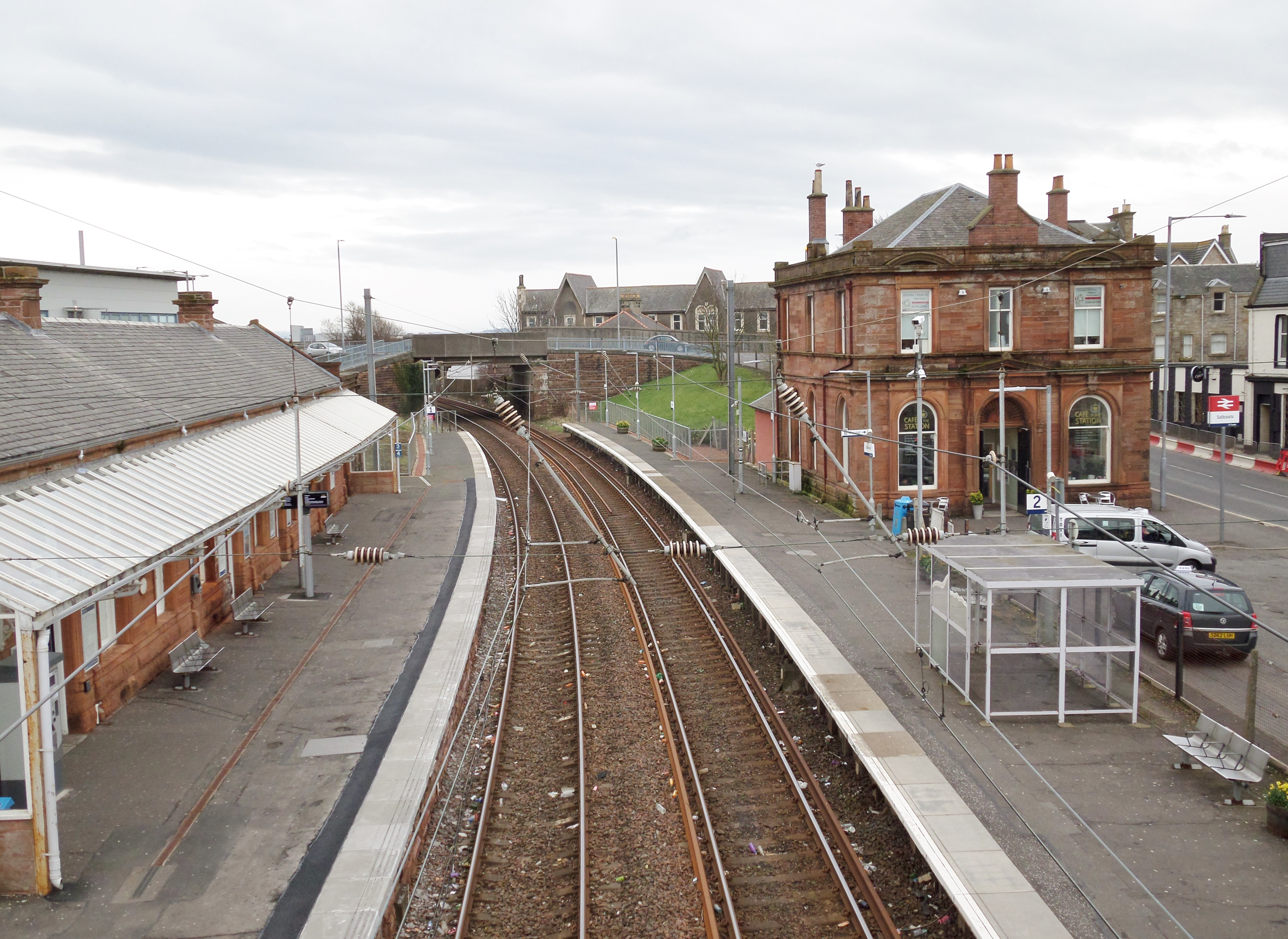
- Saltcoats railway station, looking east towards Stevenston

General information
- Location: Saltcoats, North Ayrshire; Scotland
- Coordinates: 55.6340°N 4.7849°W
- Grid reference: NS248413
- Manager: ScotRail
- Transit authority: SPT
- Platforms: 2

Other information
- Station code: SLT

History
- Original company: Ardrossan Railway
- Pre-grouping: Glasgow and South Western Railway
- Post-grouping: LMS

Key dates
- 27 July 1840: Opened as Saltcoats
- 1 July 1858: Relocated due west
- 1882: Relocated between two previous sites
- 30 June 1952: Renamed Saltcoats Central
- 4 February 1965: Renamed Saltcoats

Passengers
- 2021/22: ▲0.179 million
- 2022/23: ▲0.219 million
- 2023/24: ▲0.260 million
- 2024/25: ▲0.275 million
- 2025/26: ▲0.282 million
Location
Notes
- Passenger statistics from the Office of Rail and Road

Saltcoats railway station is a railway station serving the town of Saltcoats, North Ayrshire, Scotland. The station is managed by ScotRail and is on the Ayrshire Coast Line.

== History ==
The station originally opened on 27 July 1840 by the Ardrossan Railway. The station was relocated a short distance west of the original location on 1 July 1858 and relocated again to its present location (between the first two sites) in 1882. The station was known as Saltcoats Central from 30 June 1952 to 4 February 1965, when it was renamed back to its original name.

== Station description ==
Saltcoats station has two large station buildings, one of which is still in use as a ticket office. The second building on the westbound platform was once used as the station offices and station master's house, and is now a cafe.

== Services ==
Monday to Saturday daytimes there are half-hourly services eastbound to Glasgow Central and hourly westbound to Largs and Ardrossan Harbour respectively.

On Sundays there is an hourly service eastbound to Glasgow Central and westbound to Largs, plus five trains to Ardrossan Harbour to connect with the ferry to the Isle of Arran.

Preceding station	National Rail	Following station
Ardrossan South Beach	ScotRail; Ayrshire Coast Line	Stevenston
	Historical railways	
Ardrossan South Beach; Line and station open	Glasgow and South Western Railway; Ardrossan Railway	Stevenston; Line and station open
