= Ardeer Platform railway station =

Former railway station in North Ayrshire, Scotland

Ardeer Platform
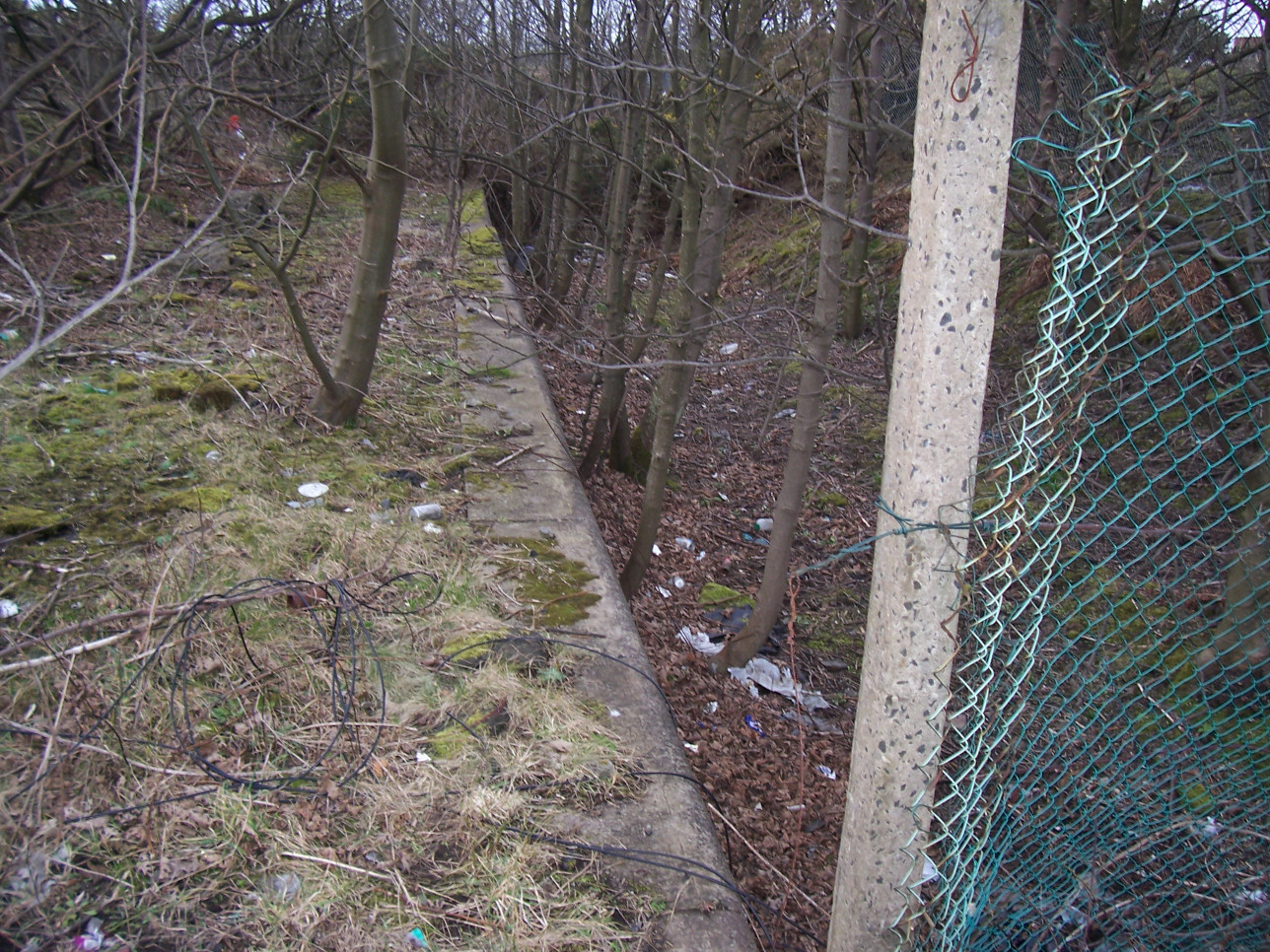
- The remains of Ardeer Platform in 2007

General information
- Location: Nobel Industries, Ayrshire; Scotland
- Coordinates: 55.6267°N 4.7296°W
- Grid reference: NS281404
- Platforms: 1

Other information
- Status: Disused

History
- Pre-grouping: Caledonian and Glasgow & South Western Railways

Key dates
- 1896: Opened
- 3 October 1966: Closed
Location

Ardeer Platform railway station was a railway station serving the Nobel Industries division of Imperial Chemical Industries near the town of Stevenston, North Ayrshire, Scotland.

== History ==
Opened in 1896, the station and its associated branch line were known locally as "Nobel's private line", although in reality both the line and station were jointly run by the Glasgow and South Western Railway (G&SWR) and the Lanarkshire and Ayrshire Railway (L&AR). The station was originally called Ardeer Works Platform but at some point the 'Works' title was dropped. The branch became part of the London, Midland and Scottish Railway during the Grouping of 1923, later passed on to the Scottish Region of British Railways on nationalisation in 1948, and eventually closed by the British Railways Board on 3 October 1966.

The station was a long, single platform to accommodate the thousands of personnel that once worked at the factory, and was long enough to accommodate two trains. Originally the platform was wooden but at some point was replaced with a concrete platform. A long shelter was also situated on the platform in later years. The station was primarily used by factory workers however in 1902 the station was used by the various prime ministers of the British Colonies and their guests, along with the provost and magistrates of Glasgow to visit the factory after the Coronation of King Edward VII.

Today the platform still exists although heavily overgrown and in disrepair. The branch from the Ayrshire Coast Line that carried trains to the station still existed (branching off in another direction just before the platform) until the early 2000s, now only a small stub off the main line remains.

Because of the large numbers of workers using the station, a second platform had to be built on the other side of the River Garnock at the so-called 'Snodgrass branch' (named after the former Snodgrass village in the area) in the 1940s. Access to this platform was gained via the Glasgow to Ayr line, just north of Bogside railway station. This branch is now also a small stub.

== Future ==
Plans for redevelopment of the Ardeer Peninsula by NPL Estates include the possibility of reopening the former Nobel branch for industrial use. The plans also include a proposed station near to the former Stevenston No. 1 Junction, where the Nobel line joined the former G&SWR main line.

Preceding station	Historical railways	Following station
Stevenston; Line closed, station open	Glasgow and South Western Railway; Ardrossan Railway	Terminus
Stevenston; Line and station closed	Caledonian Railway; Lanarkshire and Ayrshire Railway	Terminus
