= Kilwinning railway station =

Railway station in North Ayrshire, Scotland

Kilwinning Scottish Gaelic: Cill D'Fhinnein
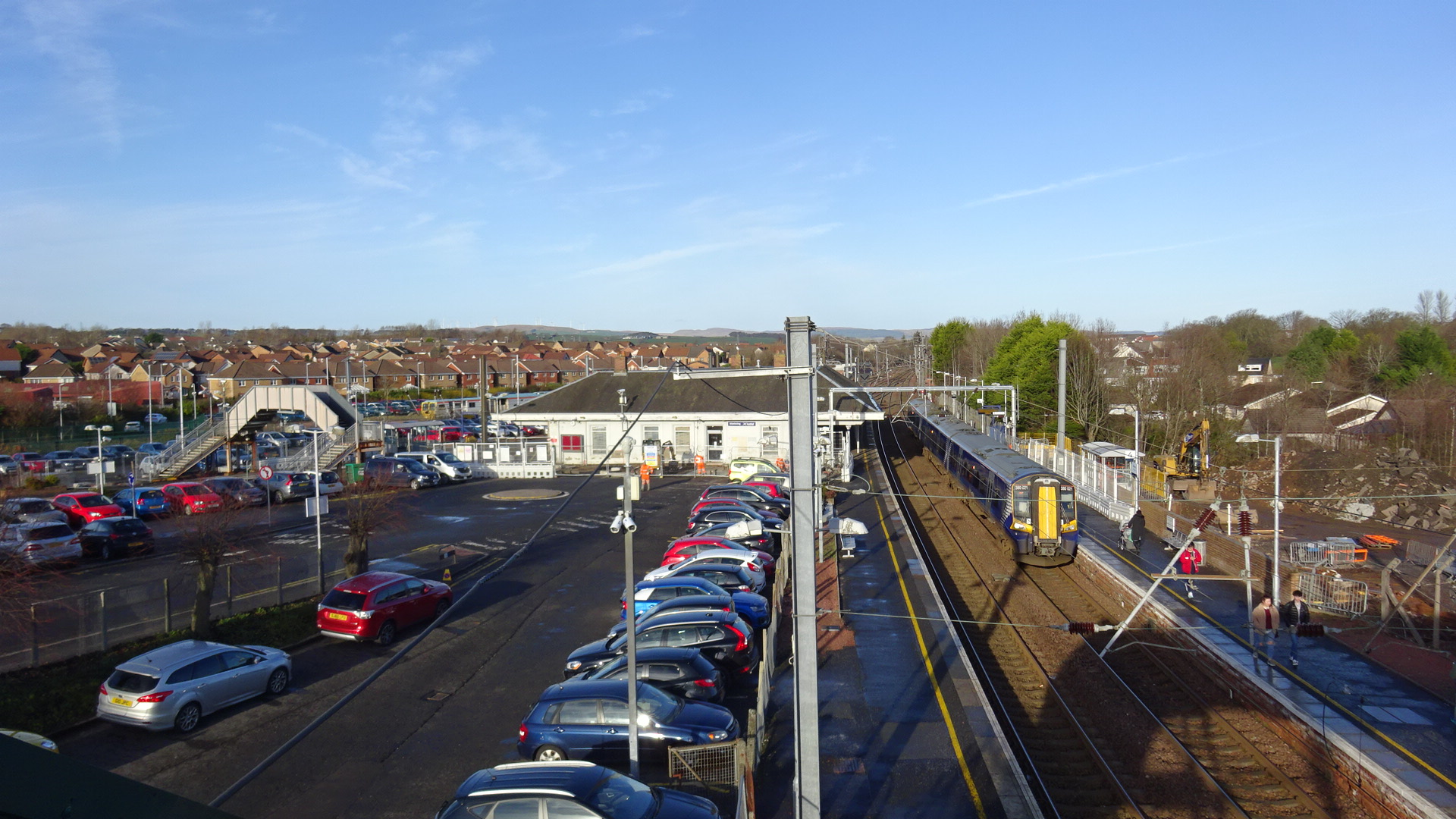
- Overview of Kilwinning railway station in 2019, Platforms 1 and 2 are to the left where trains to Glasgow, Ardrossan and Largs depart from while Platforms 3 and 4 are to the right which are used by trains to Glasgow and Ayr

General information
- Location: Kilwinning, North Ayrshire; Scotland
- Coordinates: 55.6561°N 4.7096°W
- Grid reference: NS295436
- Owner: Network Rail
- Manager: ScotRail
- Transit authority: SPT
- Platforms: 4

Other information
- Station code: KWN

History
- Original company: Glasgow, Paisley, Kilmarnock and Ayr Railway
- Pre-grouping: Glasgow and South Western Railway
- Post-grouping: LMS

Key dates
- 23 March 1840: Opened

Passengers
- 2021/22: ▲0.456 million
- Interchange: ▲62,043
- 2022/23: ▲0.591 million
- Interchange: ▼60,903
- 2023/24: ▲0.710 million
- Interchange: ▲80,687
- 2024/25: ▲0.781 million
- Interchange: ▲83,979
- 2025/26: ▲0.817 million
- Interchange: ▲89,715
Location
Notes
- Passenger statistics from the Office of Rail and Road

Kilwinning railway station is a railway station serving the town of Kilwinning, North Ayrshire, Scotland. The station is managed by ScotRail and is on the Ayrshire Coast Line 26 miles (42 km) south of Glasgow Central, as well as the Glasgow South Western Line 69 miles (111 km) north of Stranraer. British Transport Police maintain an office here.

The station has the most frequent service in Ayrshire, being served by all trains on both the Ayr main line and the branches to Ardrossan Harbour and Largs, with the sole exception of 1K49 17:47 Glasgow Central to Ayr which runs non-stop from Paisley to Irvine.

== History ==
The station was opened on 23 March 1840 by the Glasgow, Paisley, Kilmarnock and Ayr Railway and was built as an interchange, seeing traffic coming from Glasgow, Ayr and Ardrossan (and later Largs).

== Station facilities ==
The station is located on Byers Road about 1/2 mile (800 m) from the town centre. There is a staffed ticket office (open Monday - Saturday 06:05 - 23:30 Sunday 08:50- 23:30), a toilet, a kiosk, a waiting room and a ticket vending machine. Train running information is offered via digital CIS displays, automated announcements, timetable posters and customer help points on each platform. In 2012, a new 130-space car park opened. There is lifts to all platforms located on Platform 1, Platform 2/3 by the main entrance and Platform 4. For security reasons, The lifts are only in operation when the ticket office are open and are locked after 7pm and when no staff are on duty

== Station usage ==
The station is popular with commuters travelling to Glasgow from Ayrshire and beyond. It is the last stop before the Ayrshire Coast line splits in two, so trains stop at this station more than any other in Ayrshire.

== British Transport Police ==
The station houses a Neighbourhood Policing Team (NPT) from the British Transport Police. Officers from Kilwinning cover all stations south of Kilwinning and north of Kilwinning until Lochwinnoch; Police Scotland officers will cover if British Transport Police officers are not available.

== Bus services ==
Most buses do not come into the station forecourt, but there is a bus stop 100 yards (90 m) north of the station.

== Services ==
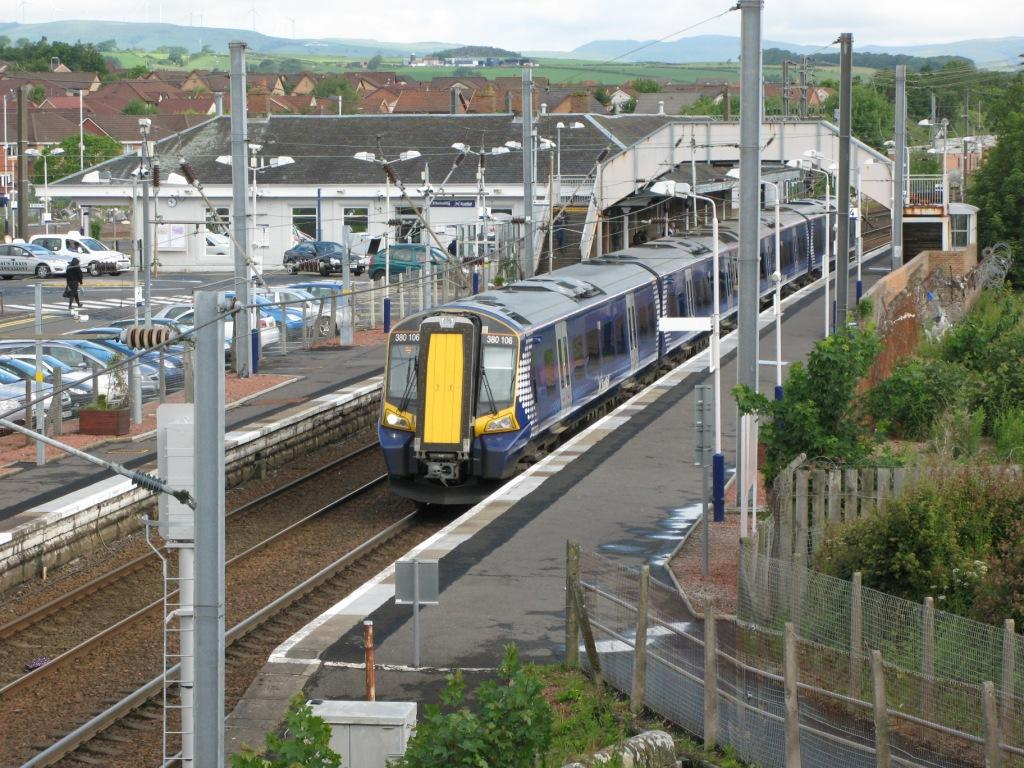
A Glasgow to Ayr service

=== 2023 ===
- 4 trains per hour to Glasgow Central (2 semi-fast and 2 all stops).
- 2 trains per hour to Ayr.
- 1 train per hour to Largs.
- 1 train per hour to Ardrossan Harbour.

The Sunday service is:

- 3 trains per hour to Glasgow Central
- 2 trains per hour to Ayr
- 1 train per hour to Largs
- 4 trains per day to Ardrossan Harbour

Preceding station	National Rail	Following station
Stevenston	ScotRail; Ayrshire Coast Line	Dalry or Glasgow Central or Johnstone
Irvine	ScotRail; Ayrshire Coast Line	Dalry or Glasgow Central or Johnstone
	Historical railways	
Ardrossan Montgomerie Pier; 1947 - 1960; Line and station closed	British Railways; Montgomerie Pier Branch	Connection with Ardrossan Railway at Stevenston No. 1 Jct.
Stevenston; Line and station open	Glasgow and South Western Railway; Ardrossan Railway	Dalry Junction; Line open; station closed
Bogside; Line open; station closed	Glasgow and South Western Railway; Glasgow, Paisley, Kilmarnock and Ayr Railway	Dalry Junction; Line open; station closed

== Rail and sea connections ==
=== Northern Ireland ===
Trains connect Ayr along the Glasgow South Western Line to Stranraer where a bus link runs: route 350 operated by Macleans Coaches (except Sundays) to Cairnryan. for onward ferries to the Port of Belfast by Stena Line and Larne Harbour by P&O Ferries.

=== Isle of Arran ===
Trains also connect along the Ayrshire Coast Line to Ardrossan Harbour for the Caledonian MacBrayne service to Brodick.
