= Ardeer =

Ardeer can refer to:

- Ardeer, North Ayrshire, Scotland
  - Ardeer Platform railway station in the area of the same name in Scotland
- Ardeer, Victoria, a suburb in Melbourne, Victoria, Australia, named after the original Scottish location
  - Ardeer railway station in the suburb of the same name in Melbourne
