= Bogside railway station =

Disused railway station in Irvine, Ayrshire

Bogside
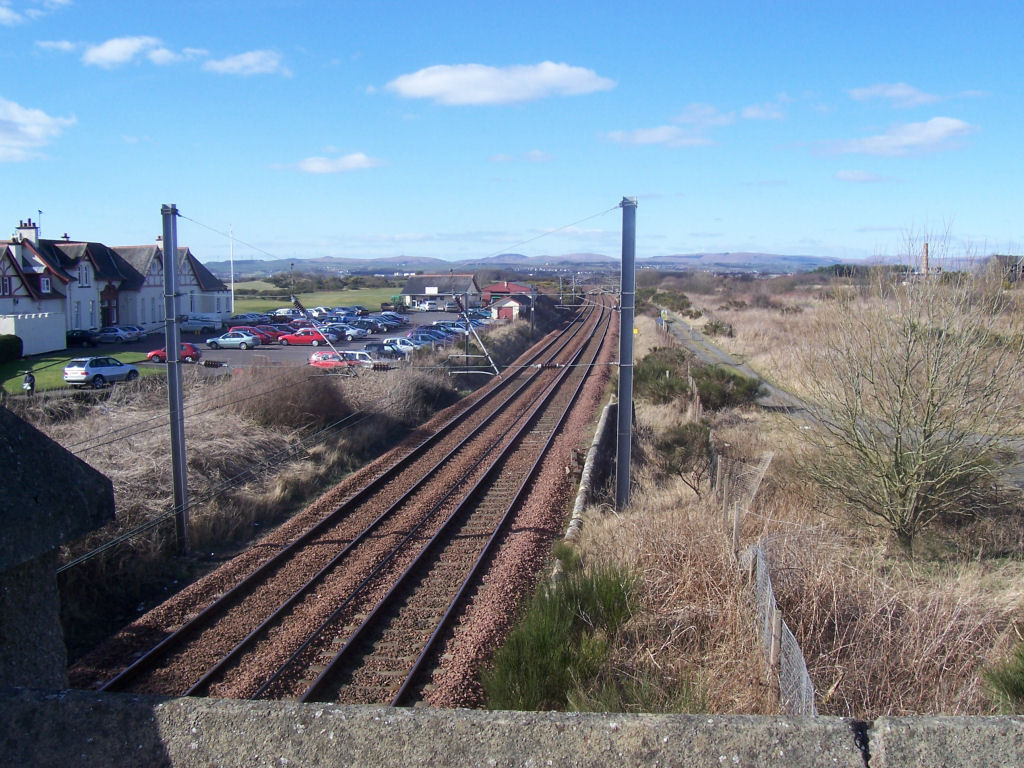
- The site of Bogside station in 2006

General information
- Location: Near Irvine, Ayrshire; Scotland
- Coordinates: 55.6273°N 4.6853°W
- Grid reference: NS309403
- Platforms: 2

Other information
- Status: Disused

History
- Original company: Glasgow, Paisley, Kilmarnock and Ayr Railway
- Pre-grouping: Glasgow and South Western Railway

Key dates
- 23 March 1840: Opened (restricted access)
- 1 June 1894: Opened (full access)
- 30 June 1952: Renamed Bogside Race Course
- 14 June 1965: Renamed Bogside
- 2 January 1967: Closed
Location

Bogside railway station was a railway station serving north of Irvine, North Ayrshire, Scotland. The station was originally part of the Glasgow, Paisley, Kilmarnock and Ayr Railway (now the Ayrshire Coast Line).

== History ==
The station opened on 23 March 1840. Access was restricted at this station until 1 June 1894, when it became fully open to the public. The station was renamed Bogside Race Course on 30 June 1952, which, after the closure of Bogside Racecourse, was once again renamed Bogside on 14 June 1965. The station closed permanently to passengers on 2 January 1967.

== Gallery ==
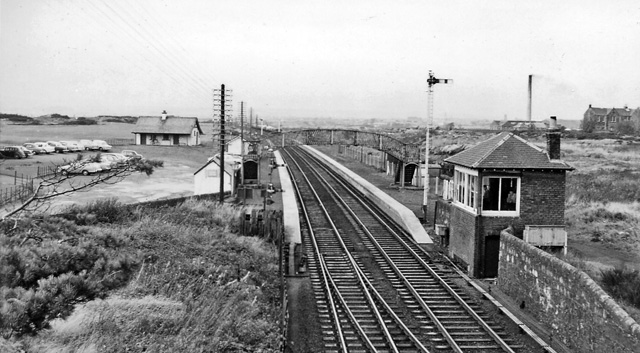
Bogside (Strathclyde) Racecourse Station in 1961

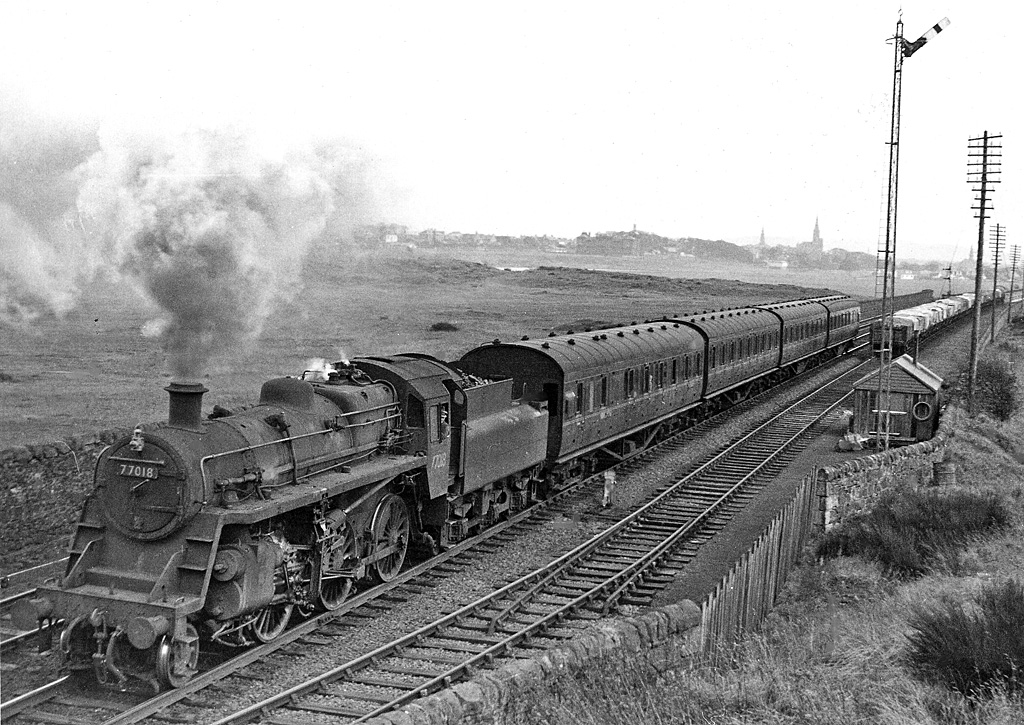
Kilmarnock - Ardrossan local train in 1961

| Preceding station | Historical railways | Following station |
|---|---|---|
| Connection with GPK&AR | Glasgow and South Western Railway; Ardrossan Railway | Stevenston; Link open to freight, station open |
| Irvine; Line and station open | Glasgow and South Western Railway; Glasgow, Paisley, Kilmarnock and Ayr Railway | Kilwinning; Line and station open |
