= Ardrossan Winton Pier railway station =

Disused railway station in Ardrossan, Ayrshire

Ardrossan Winton Pier
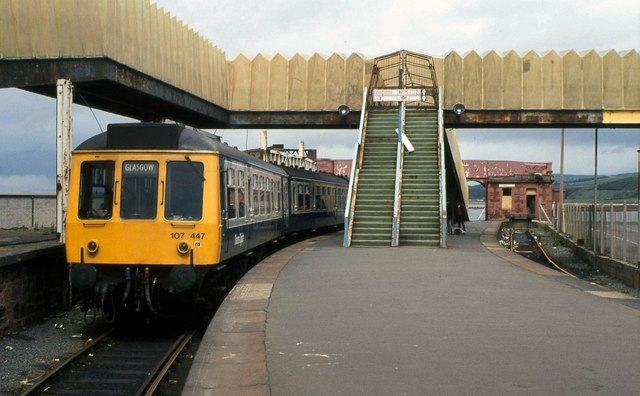
- The station on 22 June 1984, with the 12.33 to Glasgow Central waiting to depart

General information
- Location: Ardrossan, Ayrshire; Scotland
- Coordinates: 55.6405°N 4.8223°W
- Grid reference: NS223422
- Platforms: 1

Other information
- Status: Disused

History
- Original company: Ardrossan Railway
- Pre-grouping: Glasgow and South Western Railway
- Post-grouping: LMS

Key dates
- 27 July 1840: Opened as Ardrossan Pier
- 2 June 1924: Renamed Ardrossan Winton Pier
- 19 January 1987: Closed
Location

Ardrossan Winton Pier railway station served the town of Ardrossan and its harbour, North Ayrshire, Scotland. The station allowed train passengers to link with the Caledonian MacBrayne (CalMac) ferry sailings to Brodick on the Isle of Arran and other destinations.

== History ==
The station was opened on 27 July 1840 as part of the Ardrossan Railway (later merged with the Glasgow and South Western Railway) and was known as Ardrossan Pier. Upon the grouping of the G&SWR into the London, Midland and Scottish Railway during the Grouping of 1923, the station was renamed Ardrossan Winton Pier on 2 June 1924 in order to distinguish between the Ardrossan Pier station on the former Lanarkshire and Ayrshire Railway (which was renamed Ardrossan Montgomerie Pier). The station then passed on to the Scottish Region of British Railways on nationalisation in 1948.

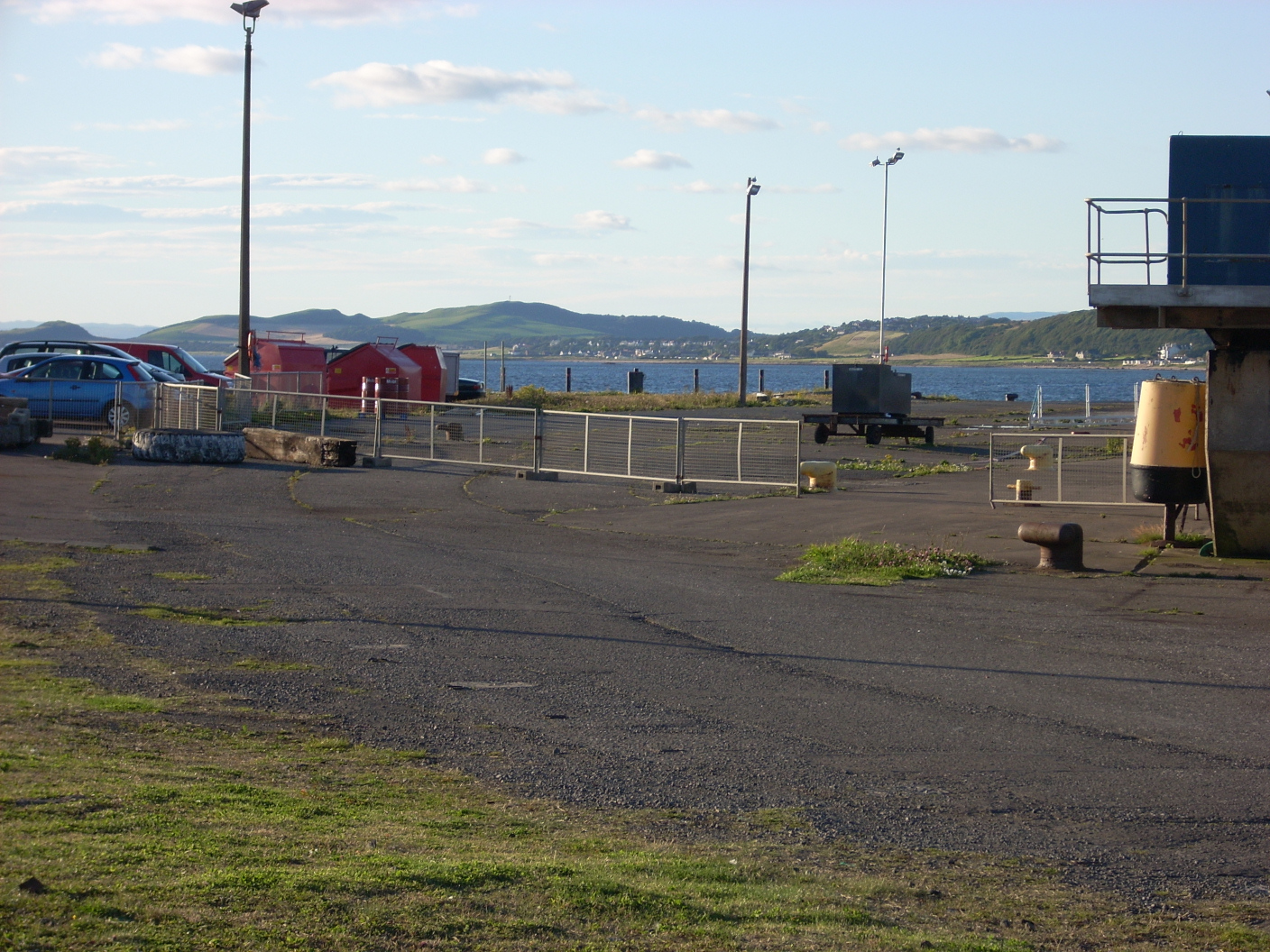
The site of the station in 2007

The station had a single island platform. With the closure of Montgomerie Pier station on 6 May 1968, Winton Pier station became the sole passenger rail terminus at the harbour. When sectorisation was introduced in the 1980s, the station was briefly served by ScotRail before closing, replaced by Ardrossan Harbour railway station (situated slightly further inland) on 19 January 1987 upon the commencement of electric services. Train services in connection with the sailings of Burns and Laird Lines to Belfast and Isle of Man Steam Packet Company to Douglas, Isle of Man ceased in 1976 and 1985, respectively, when the shipping routes closed.

The site of the station is now located behind the main CalMac ferry terminal building. Only the outline of where the platform was once located remains.

Preceding station	Historical railways	Following station
Terminus	Glasgow and South Western Railway; Ardrossan Railway	Ardrossan Town; Line partially closed; station open
