= Irvine railway station =

Railway station in North Ayrshire, Scotland

Irvine Scottish Gaelic: Irbhinn

General information
- Location: Irvine, North Ayrshire; Scotland
- Coordinates: 55.6116°N 4.6750°W
- Grid reference: NS315385
- Manager: ScotRail
- Transit authority: Strathclyde Partnership for Transport
- Platforms: 2

Other information
- Station code: IRV

Key dates
- 5 August 1839: Opened

Passengers
- 2021/22: ▲0.442 million
- 2022/23: ▲0.551 million
- 2023/24: ▲0.628 million
- 2024/25: ▲0.685 million
- 2025/26: ▲0.725 million

Listed Building – Category C(S)
- Designated: 27 August 1997
- Reference no.: LB44705
Location
Notes
- Passenger statistics from the Office of Rail and Road

Irvine railway station is a railway station serving the town of Irvine, North Ayrshire, Scotland. The station is managed by ScotRail and is on the Ayrshire Coast Line, 30 miles (48 km) south west of Glasgow Central.

== History ==
The station opened on 5 August 1839 as part of the Glasgow, Paisley, Kilmarnock and Ayr Railway. There was a branch leaving here for Crosshouse and Kilmarnock which closed in 1965. During the electrification of the Ayrshire Coast Line by British Rail, Irvine station was partially refurbished, resulting in a glass front canopy on the main building and external ramp access to both platforms.

== Facilities ==
The station is staffed on a full-time basis seven days a week. There is a small kiosk shop and an adjoining car park with 100 spaces. Train running information is offered via digital CIS displays, automated announcements, timetable posters and customer help points on each platform. Step-free access is available to both sides of the station.

== Services (as of May 2026) ==
The current service at Irvine is as follows:

=== Monday to Sunday ===
There is a half-hourly service northbound to Glasgow Central and southbound to Ayr.

| Preceding station | National Rail | Following station |
|---|---|---|
| Barassie | ScotRail; Ayrshire Coast Line | Kilwinning |
| | Historical railways | |
| Gailes; Line open, station closed | Glasgow and South Western Railway; Glasgow, Paisley, Kilmarnock and Ayr Railway | Bogside; Line open, station closed |
| Dreghorn; Line and station closed | Glasgow and South Western Railway; Glasgow, Paisley, Kilmarnock and Ayr Railway | Bogside; Line open, station closed |
