= Ardrossan Harbour railway station =

Railway station in North Ayrshire, Scotland

Ardrossan Harbour Scottish Gaelic: Caladh Àird Rosain

General information
- Location: Ardrossan, North Ayrshire; Scotland
- Coordinates: 55.6396°N 4.8205°W
- Grid reference: NS224420
- Owner: Network Rail
- Manager: ScotRail
- Transit authority: SPT
- Platforms: 1

Other information
- Station code: ADS

Key dates
- 19 January 1987: Opened

Passengers
- 2021/22: ▲58,594
- 2022/23: ▲92,422
- 2023/24: ▲0.107 million
- 2024/25: ▼84,144
- 2025/26: ▼41,158
Location
Notes
- Passenger statistics from the Office of Rail and Road

Ardrossan Harbour railway station is one of three remaining railway stations in the town of Ardrossan, North Ayrshire, Scotland. The station is managed by ScotRail. It is on the Ayrshire Coast Line, 32.5 miles (52.3 km) south west of Glasgow Central. The station is an interchange for Caledonian MacBrayne ferry sailings to Brodick on the Isle of Arran.

== History ==
The station was originally opened on 19 January 1987 to replace the closed Ardrossan Winton Pier railway station. Ardrossan Harbour station is slightly further inland (approximately 220 yards/200 metres to the east) than its predecessor and is sited at the end of a 1-mile (1.6 km) long branch line from Ardrossan South Beach.

Opened under sectorisation of British Rail, the station was served by ScotRail until the privatisation of British Rail.

The station is unstaffed and consists of a single platform and shelter, a short walk from the "CalMac" terminal building.

== Services ==
From the opening of the station, services generally only ran to connect with the CalMac sailings to Brodick.

2018:There is an hourly service for most of the day to/from Glasgow Central with a few extras during peak hours, A limited service of 5 departures and 4 arrivals operates on Sundays. There is no late evening service after 2200 with the last services terminating at the nearby Ardrossan Town.

Prior to May 2009, only five trains per day operated to/from the station to connect with the ferry to Brodick; all other trains terminated at the nearby Ardrossan Town.

Preceding station	National Rail	Following station
Terminus	ScotRail; Ayrshire Coast Line	Ardrossan Town
	Ferry services	
Brodick	Caledonian MacBrayne; Arran Ferry	Terminus
Campbeltown	Caledonian MacBrayne; Kintyre ferry (Suspended for the summer 2025 season)	Terminus
Brodick	Caledonian MacBrayne; Kintyre ferry (Suspended for the summer 2025 season)	Terminus

In 2018, Ardrossan Harbour had the highest proportion of late trains among all stations in Scotland.

== Ferry services ==
A ferry, operated by Caledonian MacBrayne, sails from Ardrossan Harbour to Brodick. In Summer 2013 a service to Campbeltown was provided on Thursday and Friday evenings, returning on Friday and Saturday mornings, with a return trip on Sundays.
