= Ardrossan Railway =

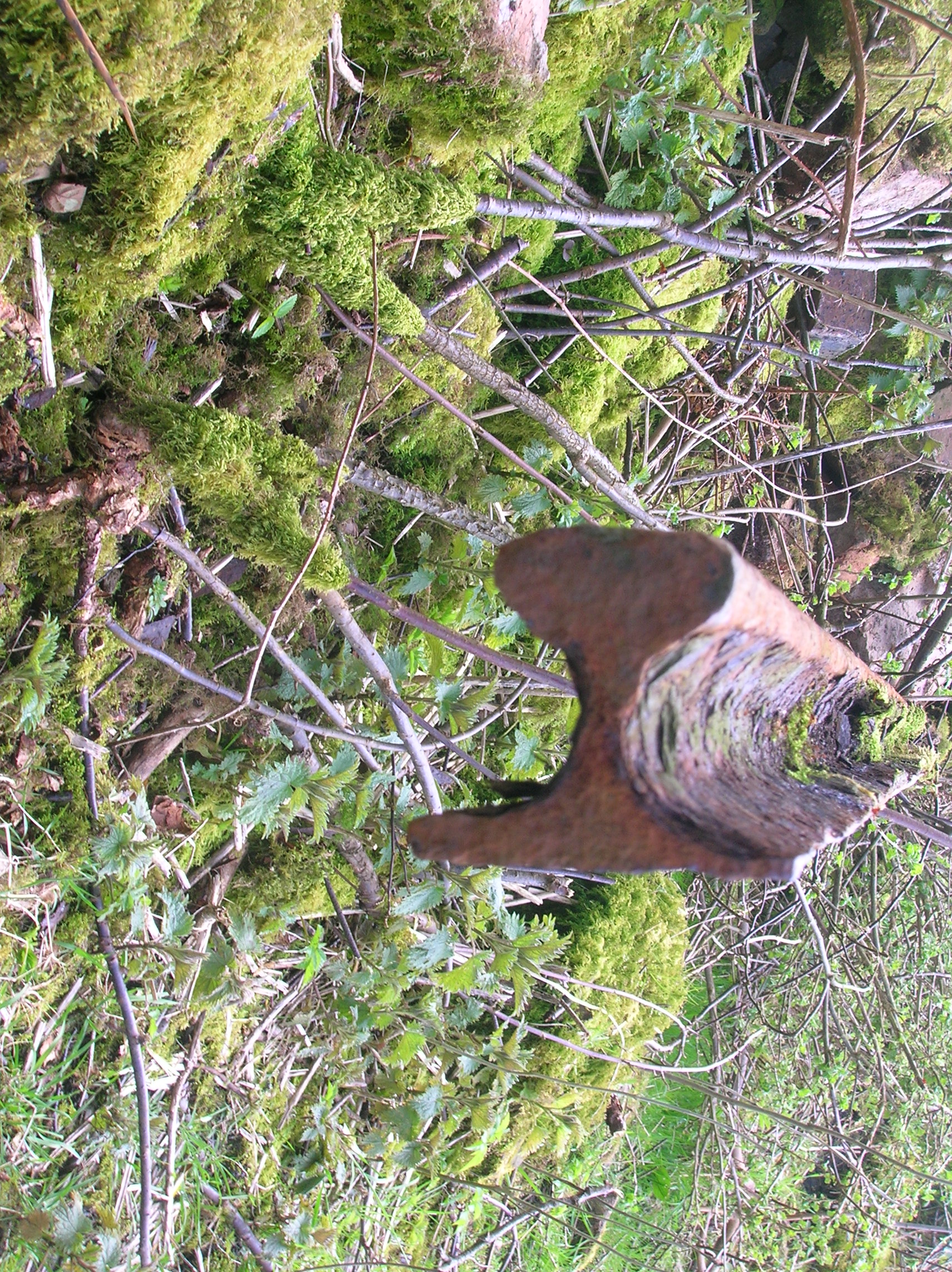
- A flat bottomed and 15-foot (4.57 m) long section of Vignoles rail from the 1831 Ardrossan and Johnstone Railway.

Overview
- Locale: Scotland

History
- Opened: 1831
- Successor: Glasgow and South Western Railway
- Closed: 1854

Technical
- Track gauge: 4 ft 6 in (1,372 mm) until 1840, 4 ft 8 1/2 in (1,435 mm) standard gauge

The Ardrossan Railway was a railway company in Scotland, whose line was built in the mid-19th century. It primarily ran services between Kilwinning and Ardrossan, as well as freight services to and from collieries between Kilwinning and Perceton. The line was later merged with the Glasgow and South Western Railway, and is today part of the Ayrshire Coast Line.

== History ==
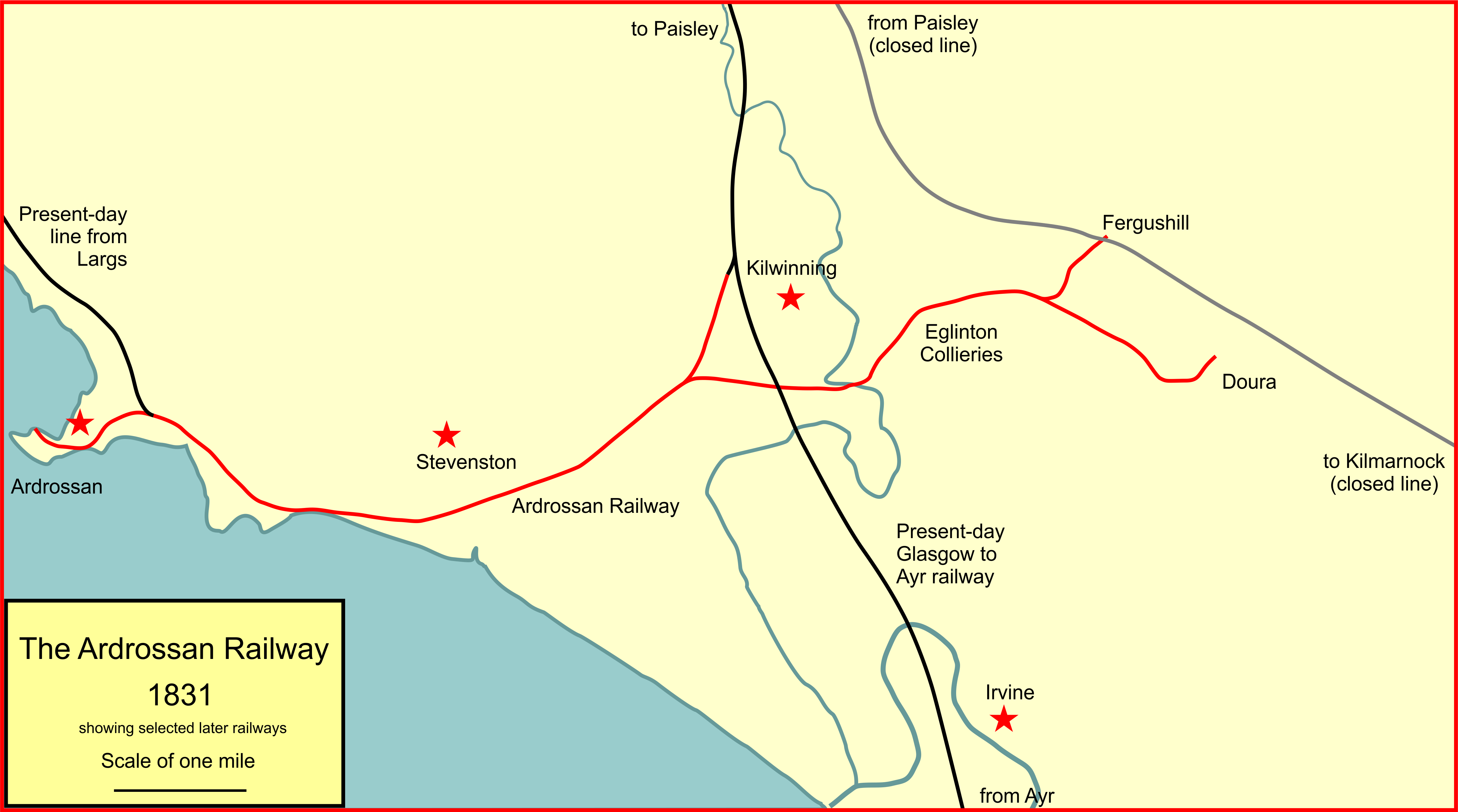
Ardrossan Railway system

In the first years of the 19th century, the 12th Earl of Eglinton developed Ardrossan Harbour, intending it as a sea port for the City of Glasgow. The extensive works he had carried out cost over £100,000. At that time the River Clyde was not navigable to large vessels, and he proposed a canal to reach Ardrossan. In 1806 he obtained authority in the Glasgow, Paisley and Ardrossan Canal Act 1806 (46 Geo. 3. c. lxxv) to construct the Glasgow, Paisley and Ardrossan Canal. The authorised share capital was £140,000, but subscriptions disappointed him, amounting to only £44,342. Work proceeded from the Glasgow end, but the canal only reached Johnstone, all of the available money having been expended and debts of £71,209 incurred.

Glasgow, Paisley and Ardrossan Canal and Railway Act 1827
- Act of Parliament
- Parliament of the United Kingdom
- Long title: An Act to amend an Act of the Forty sixth Year of the Reign of His late Majesty, incorporating the Glasgow, Paisley, and Ardrossan Canal Company; and to empower the said Company to form a Railway from Johnstone in the County of Renfrew to Ardrossan in the County of Ayr, and certain Branch Railways communicating therewith.
- Citation: 7 & 8 Geo. 4. c. lxxxvii

Dates
- Royal assent: 14 June 1827

Other legislation
- Amends: Glasgow, Paisley and Ardrossan Canal Act 1806

Text of statute as originally enacted

The truncated canal traded for some years, but in the 1820s the idea was proposed to build a railway to close the gap. The Glasgow, Paisley and Ardrossan Canal and Railway Act 1827 (7 & 8 Geo. 4. c. lxxxvii) was obtained on 14 June 1827, the estimate for the work being £94,093; the debt of the canal enterprise was not assumed by the new railway company.

Once again subscriptions fell short of the desired value: they amounted to only £28,950, but work started, from the Ardrossan end, and once again the money was entirely expended, this time with debts of £20,000, after only part of the scheme was built. It reached only from Ardrossan to Kilwinning, but with a long eastward branch in an arc to the north of the grounds of Eglinton Castle that served collieries—most of them part of Eglinton's estate. By now the Clyde had been deepened and sea-going vessels could reach Glasgow. In comparison, even had the railway been completed, cargoes via Ardrossan would have required transshipment twice (from ship to railway and from railway to canal), and it was clear that shipping owners would find that unattractive. It is likely that the emphasis had shifted from making the Glasgow connection.

The line opened in 1831; it was horse-operated and the track gauge 4 ft 6 in (1,372 mm) (later sometimes referred to as the Scotch gauge). For passenger services, a carriage held 24 passengers; 16 inside and 8 outside.

The rail was of the fish-bellied type, weighing 28 lb/yd (13.9 kg/m), supported at a pitch of 3 feet (0.91 m) on small freestone blocks. The principal goods traffic was coal from the collieries served; Whishaw says that "The amount of coals from the Eglinton coal-field is stated to be about 80,000 long tons (90,000 short tons; 81,000 t) per annum; and the average number of passengers, for the three years ending September 1839, about 31,000 annually. There are about 440 wagons in use on this line, which belong to the coal-proprietors." That is, the line provided the track for hauliers to use, for a toll.

He goes on, "The carriages hitherto used on this line were drawn by horses; each carriage holding twenty-four passengers, viz. sixteen inside and eight outside ... The outside seats are on the same level as those within; the one being in front, the other behind. ... Previously to November 1838, the passenger's fare was set at the rate of one penny per mile; but was raised in consequence of the Government duty to 8d. per six miles, or 1 1/3d. per mile." About a hundred passengers a day is a remarkable number for a line with a limited network.

In 1839 the railway was upgraded to standard gauge with heavier rails, and gradients on the main line improved.

=== Route ===
The main line of the railway followed the route towards Johnstone shown in John Thomson's Atlas of Scotland. From Ardrossan, the proposed line goes east through Saltcoats then to the south of Stevenston before turning north between Dubbs and Todhills to pass to the west of Kilwinning, where the railway terminated. The Doura mineral railway branch to collieries ran east from a junction north of Dubbs (Dubbs Junction) to a bridge across the River Garnock (at Dirrans), then turned northeast to serve a broad arc of collieries to the north of the grounds of Eglinton Castle. After passing Eglinton Colliery and Corsehill Head, the track turned east to a bridge over Lugton Water before a branch line north to the Fergushill colliery. The mineral railway continued southeast past Benslie pit then ended turning north to coal pits at Doura. The mineral line was later extended south to coal and fireclay workings at Perceton.

The railway provided a route to the huge Eglinton Tournament of 1839. One spectator described a crowded paddle steamer from Liverpool which landed at Ardrossan pier: "Disembarking, we seized upon a sort of carriage which plied upon a coal train and carried a large assortment of passengers, all drawn by one horse, and set out for the little town of Irvine."

When the Glasgow, Paisley, Kilmarnock and Ayr Railway was opened in 1840, the Ardrossan railway now became a branch line joining this new railway at Kilwinning, and the new line south from Kilwinning to Irvine crossed over the Doura branch line a short distance to the west of the Garnock bridge.

=== Locomotive operation ===
Ardrossan Railway Transfer Act 1854
- Act of Parliament
- Parliament of the United Kingdom
- Long title: An Act for vesting the Ardrossan Railway in the Glasgow and South-western Railway Company, and for other Purposes.
- Citation: 17 & 18 Vict. c. clxxxii

Dates
- Royal assent: 24 July 1854

Text of statute as originally enacted

In 1840 the line was regauged to standard gauge and connected with the Glasgow, Paisley, Kilmarnock and Ayr Railway at Kilwinning station. The permanent way was largely relaid with heavier equipment to accommodate locomotive operation, and the line was doubled. In 1854 both lines merged with the new Glasgow and South Western Railway, the Ardrossan Railway being merged into the GSWR by the Ardrossan Railway Transfer Act 1854 (17 & 18 Vict. c. clxxxii).

== Connections to other lines ==
- Glasgow, Paisley, Kilmarnock and Ayr Railway at Kilwinning

== Current operations ==
The majority of this line is still in use as part of the Largs branch, carrying passenger services marketed as the Ayrshire Coast Line. The Doura branch from Dubbs closed, and the short section at Ardrossan which later served Ardrossan Winton Pier railway station was shortened to Ardrossan Harbour railway station).
