= Ayrshire Coast Line =

Line within the Strathclyde suburban rail network in Scotland

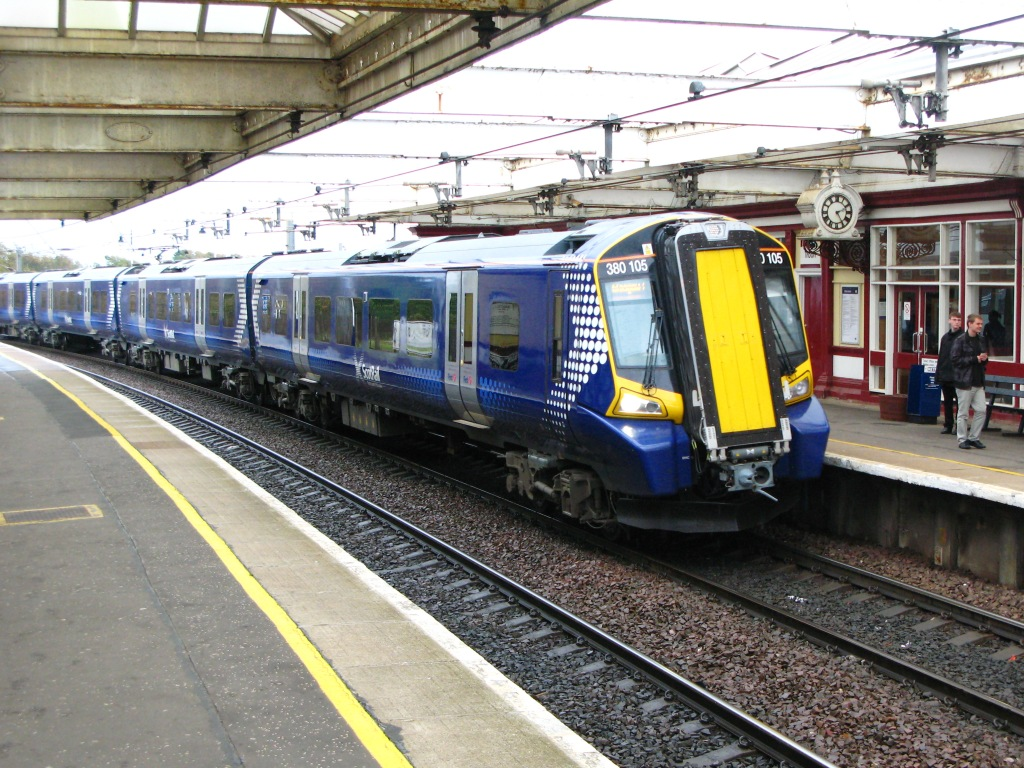
- Class 380 train at Troon

Overview
- Status: Operational
- Owner: Network Rail
- Locale: Scotland
- Stations: 26

Service
- Type: Heavy rail
- System: National Rail
- Operator: ScotRail
- Rolling stock: Class 380 and Class 156

Technical
- Num of tracks: Double and single line
- Track gauge: 4 ft 8 1/2 in (1,435 mm)
- Electrification: 25 kV 50 Hz AC
Route map
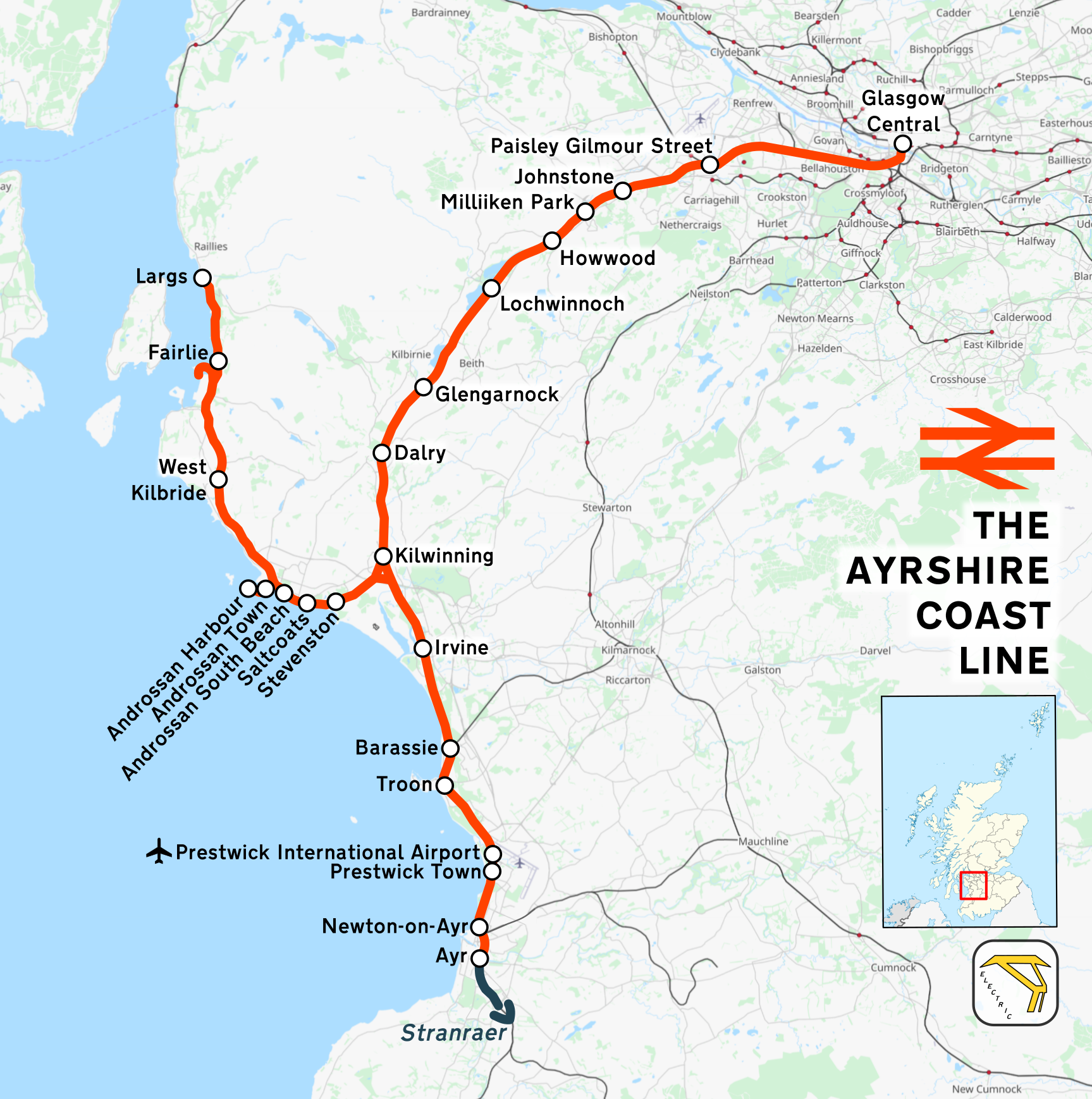
(Click to expand)

The Ayrshire Coast Line is one of the lines within the Strathclyde suburban rail network in Scotland. It has 26 stations and connects the Ayrshire coast to Glasgow. There are three branches, to Largs, Ardrossan Harbour and Ayr, all running into the high level at Glasgow Central.

The route is operated by ScotRail.

== History ==
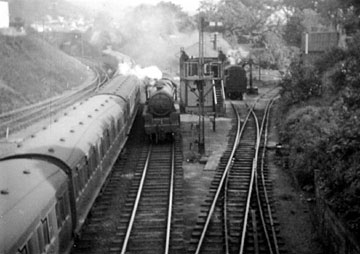
The Largs branch in steam days

The Ayrshire Coast Line consists of lines that were formerly part of the Glasgow and Paisley Joint Railway, the Glasgow, Paisley, Kilmarnock and Ayr Railway, the Ardrossan Railway and its Largs Branch extension.

=== After electrification ===
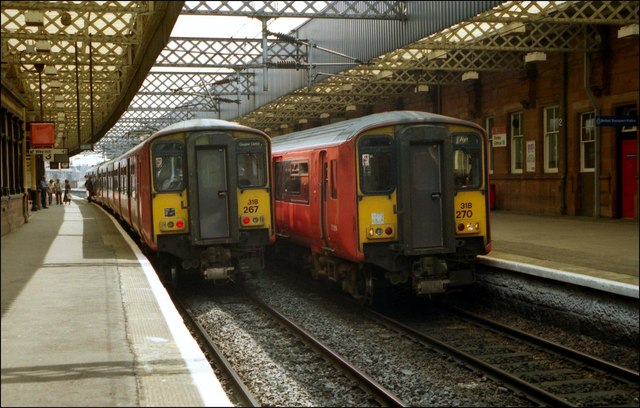
Class 318 trains at Paisley Gilmour Street in 1990

The line to Ayr was electrified and Class 318 electric multiple units introduced by British Rail in September 1986. Full authorisation for the electrification had been given in October 1982. The line was promoted as the AyrLine in Scotrail publicity. Along with the introduction of new trains, major work was undertaken refurbishing stations, major trackworks and rebuilding many bridges. At the same time resignalling was carried out, replacing the existing semaphore signals. The full electrified service, including trains to Largs and Ardrossan Harbour, commenced on 19 January 1987. These were supplemented by occasional use of Class 303 and Class 311 EMUs, then in use on the Inverclyde Line.

These EMUs replaced the Class 101 and Class 107 DMUs that had served the line for over 30 years. Class 126 DMUs were also used on the line, but they succumbed to old age in the early 1980s.

== Services 2025 ==
As of May 2025, There are 4 trains per hour running every 15 minutes between Glasgow Central and Kilwinning, 2 of these continue to Ayr while 1 an hour serves Ardrossan Harbour and Largs each. Extra trains run at peak hours, with all trains calling at Paisley Gilmour Street, Johnstone and Kilwinning. There are occasionally extra services which run to/from Ardrossan Harbour to connect with CalMac sailings to/from Brodick on Arran, There is a 2 hourly service which runs between Kilmarnock and Ayr which calls at Troon and at Prestwick Town* and up to hourly at peak times. On a Sunday, there are 3 trains an hour, 2 to Ayr and 1 to Largs and 4 trains per day to/from Ardrossan Harbour to connect with ferries, There are no Sunday services to/from Kilmarnock.

- Not all Kilmarnock trains call at Prestwick Town

== Route ==
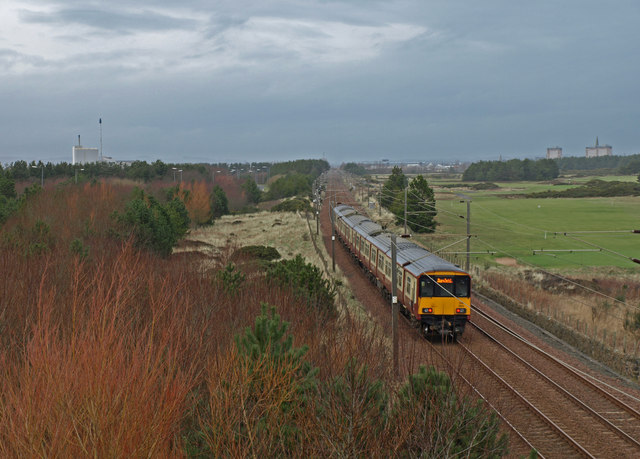
A Class 318 near Irvine

The line runs along the same Glasgow and Paisley Joint Railway route as the Inverclyde Line as far as Paisley Gilmour Street, using different platforms at Paisley Gilmour Street, where it turns south west towards Kilwinning on the route of the former Glasgow, Paisley, Kilmarnock and Ayr Railway. Here the line branches in two, with one branch running south along the coast to Troon and Ayr. This branch also serves Prestwick Airport station, which opened in 1994. The other branch runs north along the coast to Ardrossan or Largs, becoming a single track for passenger trains after Saltcoats. Beyond Ayr, 'Sprinter' DMUs continue south towards Girvan and Stranraer.

The line connects with ferries at Ardrossan to Brodick on the Isle of Arran and at Largs to Great Cumbrae.
