= Brodick =

Coordinates: 55.576°N 5.151°W

Brodick: Scottish Gaelic: Tràigh a' Chaisteil/Breadhaig
- Village
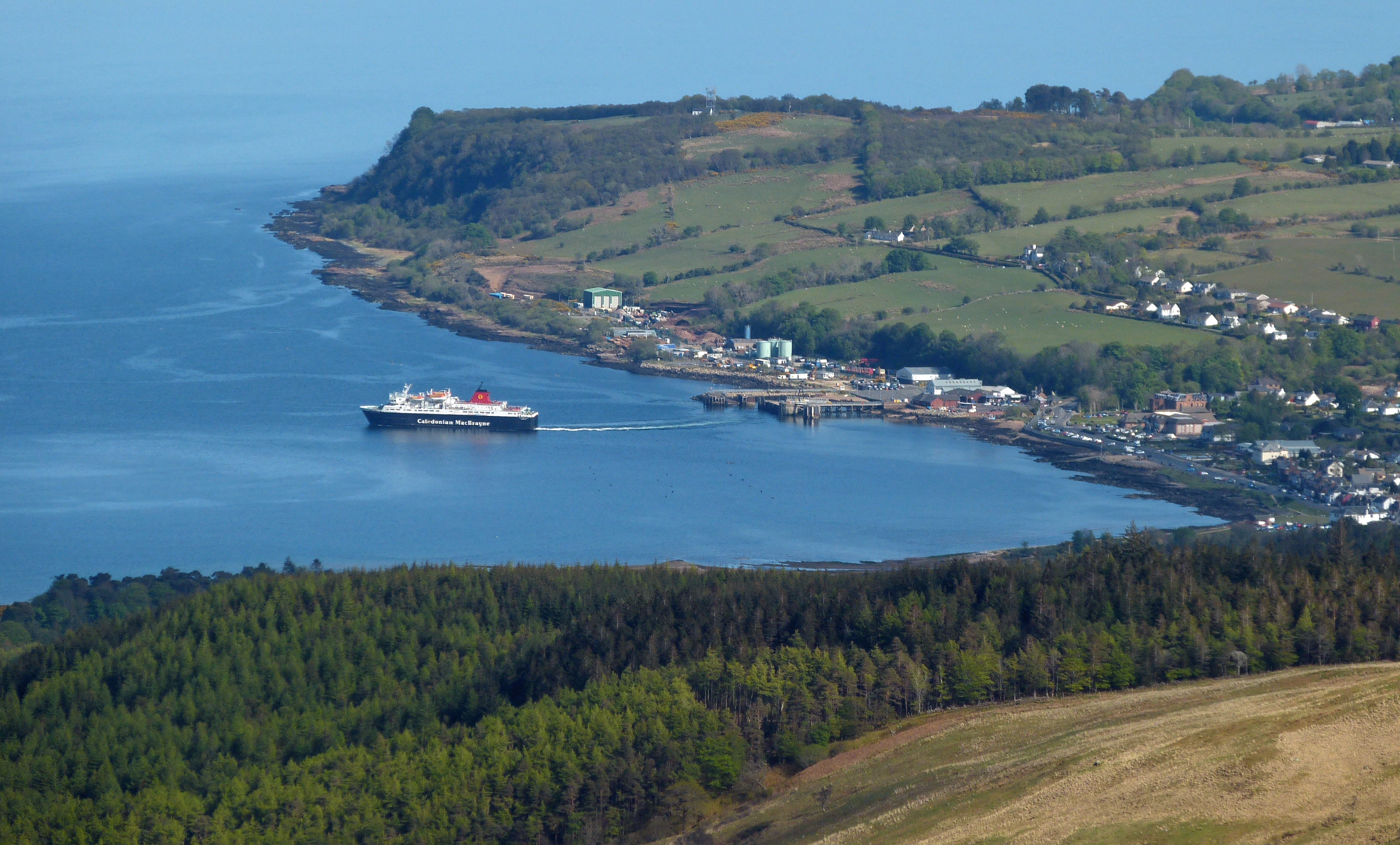
- MV Caledonian Isles departing Brodick with part of the town in the background, May 2015

- Location within North Ayrshire
- Population: 890 (2020)
  - Density: 6.54/ha
- OS grid reference: NS014358
  - Edinburgh: 96 mi (154 km)
  - London: 443 mi (713 km)
- Civil parish: Kilbride
- Council area: North Ayrshire
- Lieutenancy area: Ayrshire and Arran
- Country: Scotland
- Sovereign state: United Kingdom
- Post town: ISLE OF ARRAN
- Postcode district: KA27
- Dialling code: 01770
- Police: Scotland
- Fire: Scottish
- Ambulance: Scottish
- UK Parliament: North Ayrshire and Arran
- Scottish Parliament: Cunninghame North
- Website: North Ayrshire Council

Brodick (/ˈbrɒdɪk/ BROD-ik, Scottish Gaelic: Tràigh a' Chaisteil ("Castle Beach") or Breadhaig) is the main village on the Isle of Arran, in the Firth of Clyde, Scotland. It is halfway along the east coast of the island, in Brodick Bay below Goat Fell, the tallest mountain on Arran. The name is derived from the Norse "breda-vick" meaning "Broad Bay".

The harbour receives its main ferry services between Arran and the mainland via Ardrossan and Troon. Brodick Castle is a former residence of the Dukes of Hamilton.

Brodick is one of the largest villages on the island and is seen as the main hub due to the ferry terminal which connects the island to the mainland. It is host to many homes, hotels and shops, a health centre, nursing home, heritage museum, Brodick Castle, public beach, park and an 18-hole golf course.

== Transport ==
Brodick is home to Arran's main ferry terminus, which connects to Ardrossan and the national rail network. Operated by Caledonian MacBrayne, MV Glen Sannox & MV Caledonian Isles serves the island year-round. The crossing, which takes less than an hour, is one of the busiest on the CalMac network, and dolphins and basking sharks are occasionally spotted en route. A second, smaller ferry – MV Catriona – sails from Lochranza to Claonaig on the Kintyre peninsula between March and October. During the winter period, the vessel operates to and from Tarbert instead.

The village has seen investment recently, with £30 million being spent on a new pier and passenger terminal capable of handling two vessels at once, increasing capacity.

In addition to the new ferry terminal, which was formally opened by Derek Mackay MSP on 12 April 2018, the island is expected to get two new dual-fuelled ferries. The first, MV Glen Sannox, initially planned to enter service in summer 2018, but didn't enter service in January 2025. A sister MV Glen Rosa is expected to follow in late 2025. The problems around the delivery of these vessels has become a Scottish political scandal dubbed the Ferry Fiasco.

The village is connected to all parts of the island by road, including the villages of Lamlash and Whiting Bay to the south, Lochranza to the north and Blackwaterfoot to the west.

An upgraded bus terminal, opened at the ferry terminal in early 2017, is a hub for transport on the island, providing many bus services.

== Village ==
Brodick is a popular holiday destination and a base for hill-walking. Tourism provides much of the village's economic base. There are many family-owned and independent businesses, such as hotels, restaurants, shops, bed and breakfast establishments, guest houses and outdoor activities. There is also a brewery (located in nearby Cladach), a sports and leisure complex, and an 18-hole golf course.

The village of Brodick is the largest settlement on the island (although Lamlash has a larger population), and is seen as the centre of economic activity due to the many businesses that are located around the village. These include the 22 bedroom Douglas Hotel & Bar, and the Auchrannie Spa and Resort, which comprises two 4-star hotels with 85 rooms and thirty 5-star self-catering lodges along with a spa, two leisure centres, and adventure company and more on site.

Brodick has a range of amenities, including a primary school, a village hall, a library, a church, a sports park, a health centre, and a beach. Brodick also has a large Co-op supermarket in the heart of the village, along with a smaller Co-op convenience store located at Invercloy. Brodick has a variety of businesses, including hairdressers, estate agents, a post office, gift shops, a bakery, a chocolate shop, and a bike rental store. The village is home to numerous cafes, bars, and restaurants.

The high school, council offices, Highlands and Islands University Resource Centre and hospital can all be found in Lamlash, located 3 miles (5 kilometres) to the south.

The largest peak on the island, Goat Fell, overlooks the village and Brodick Bay. Reaching 874 metres (2,867 ft) above sea-level, it is one of the most popular hiking routes in Scotland.

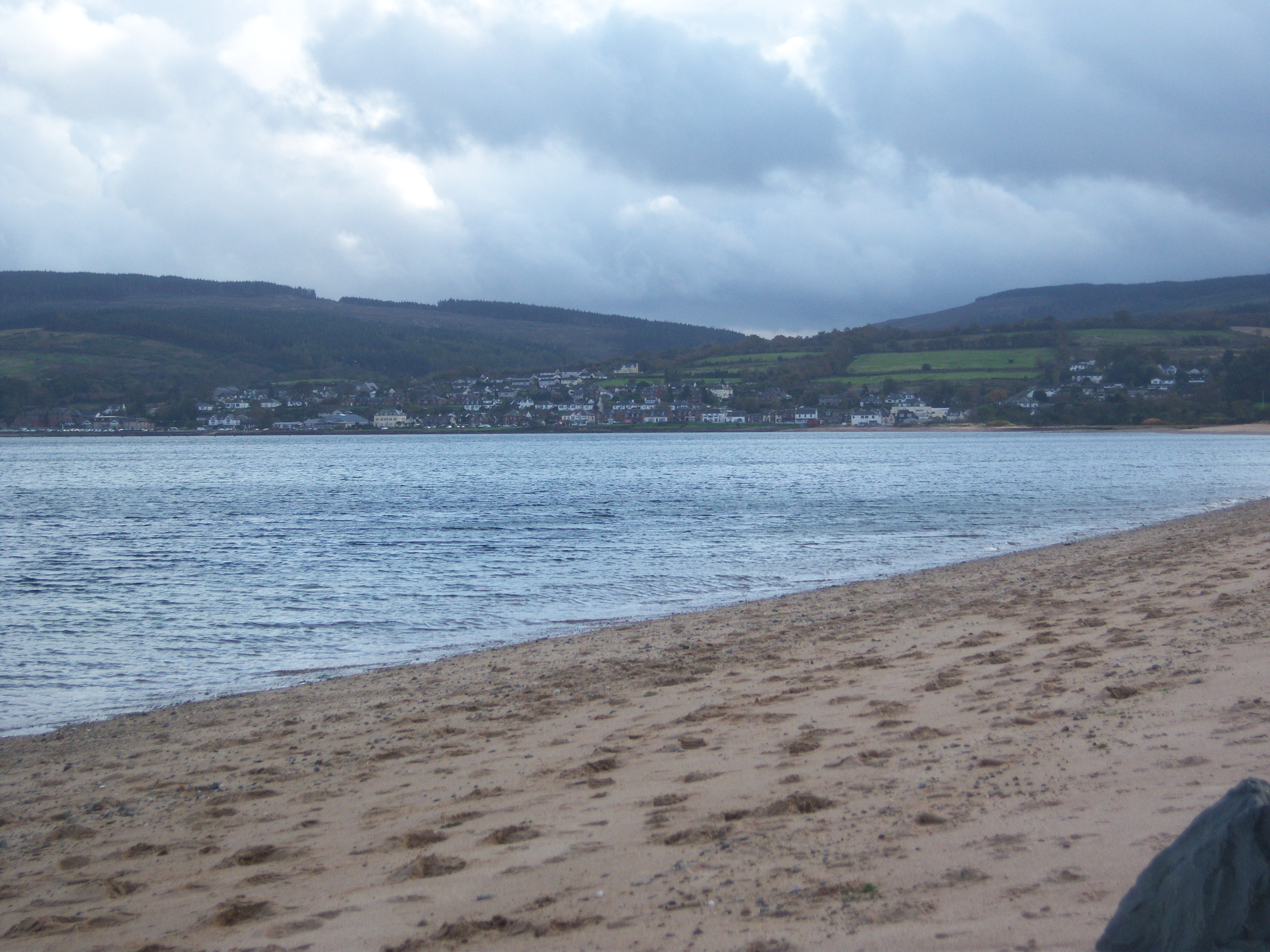
Brodick from Cladach Beach

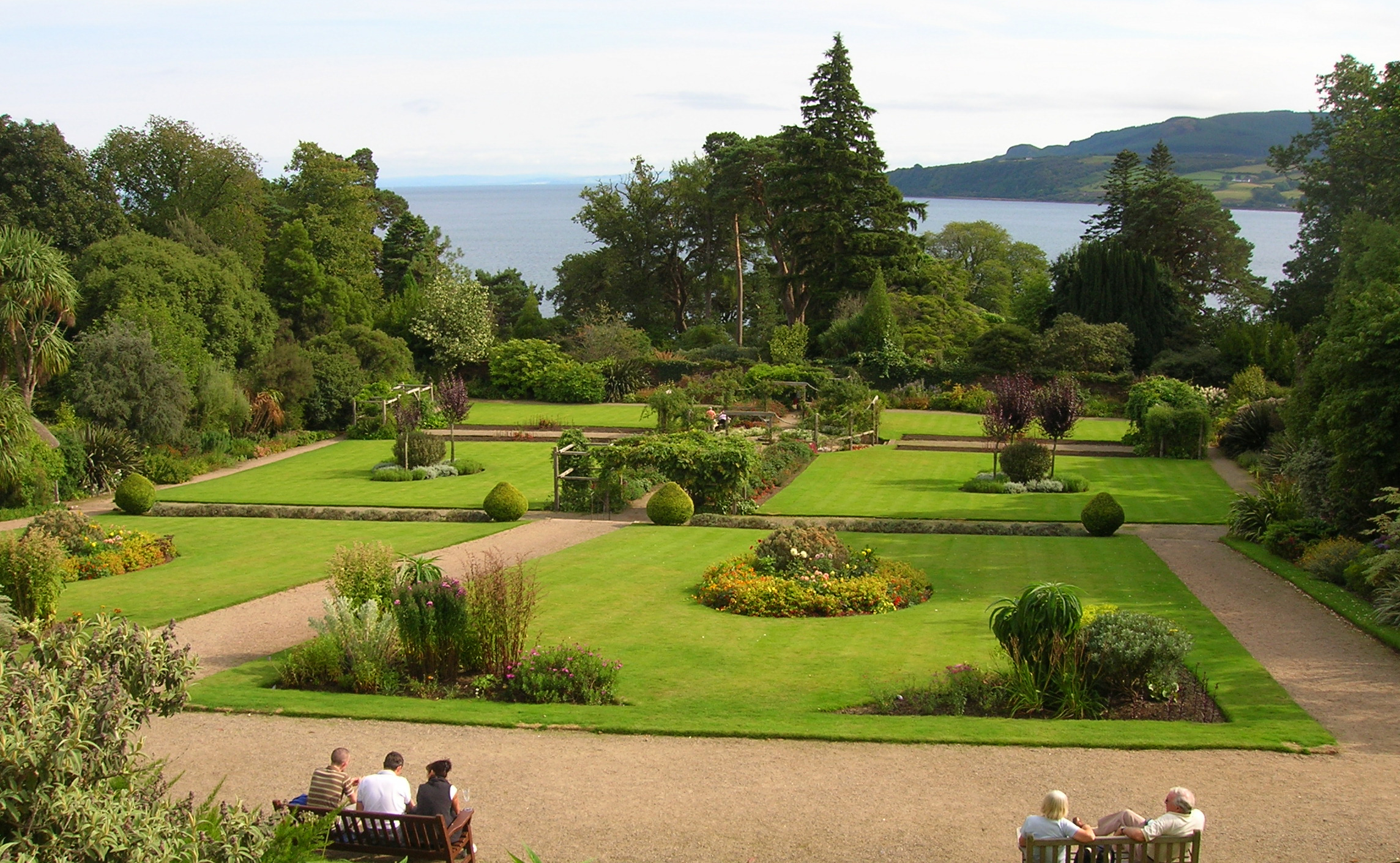
Brodick Castle Gardens

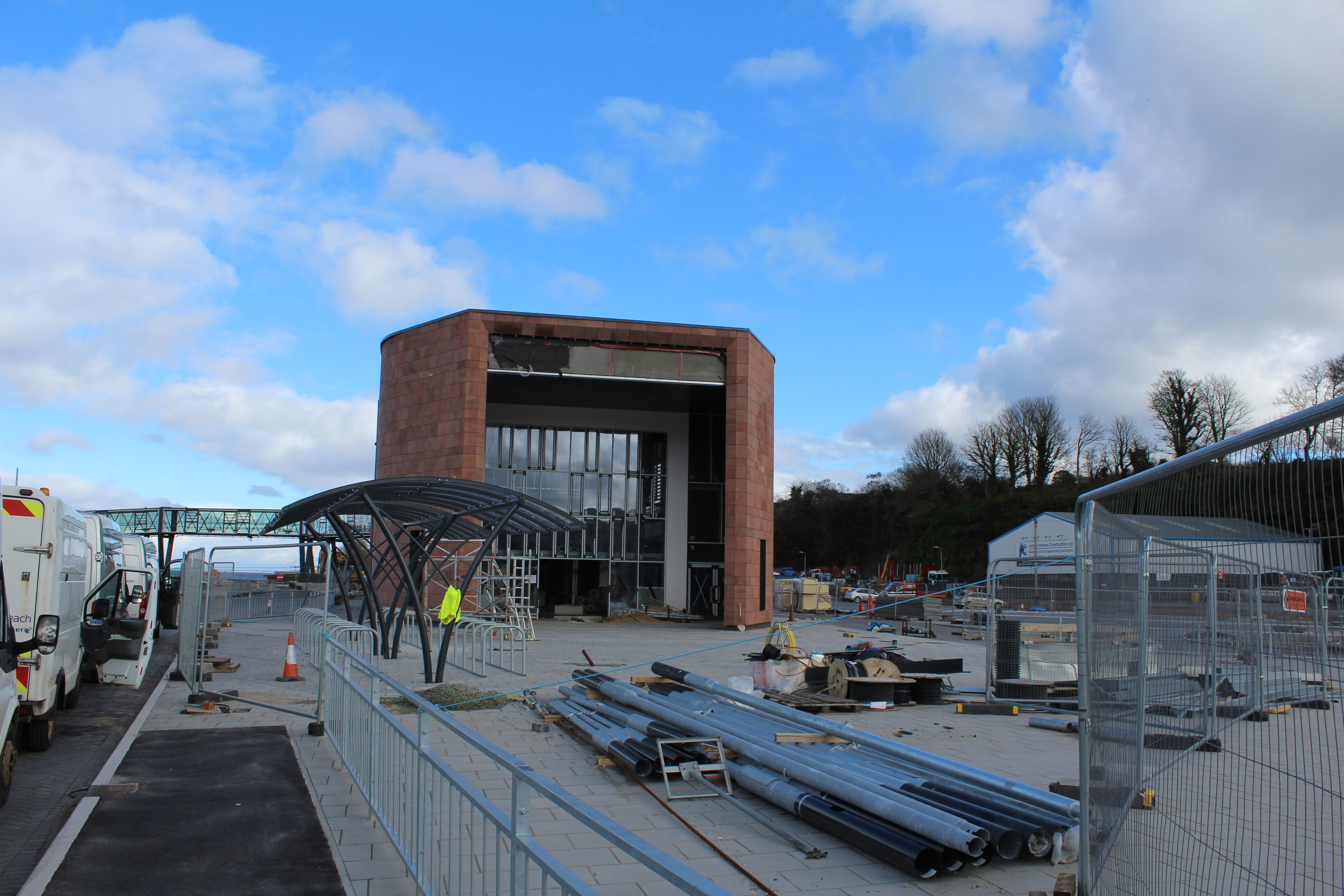
Brodick new ferry terminal under construction 2016

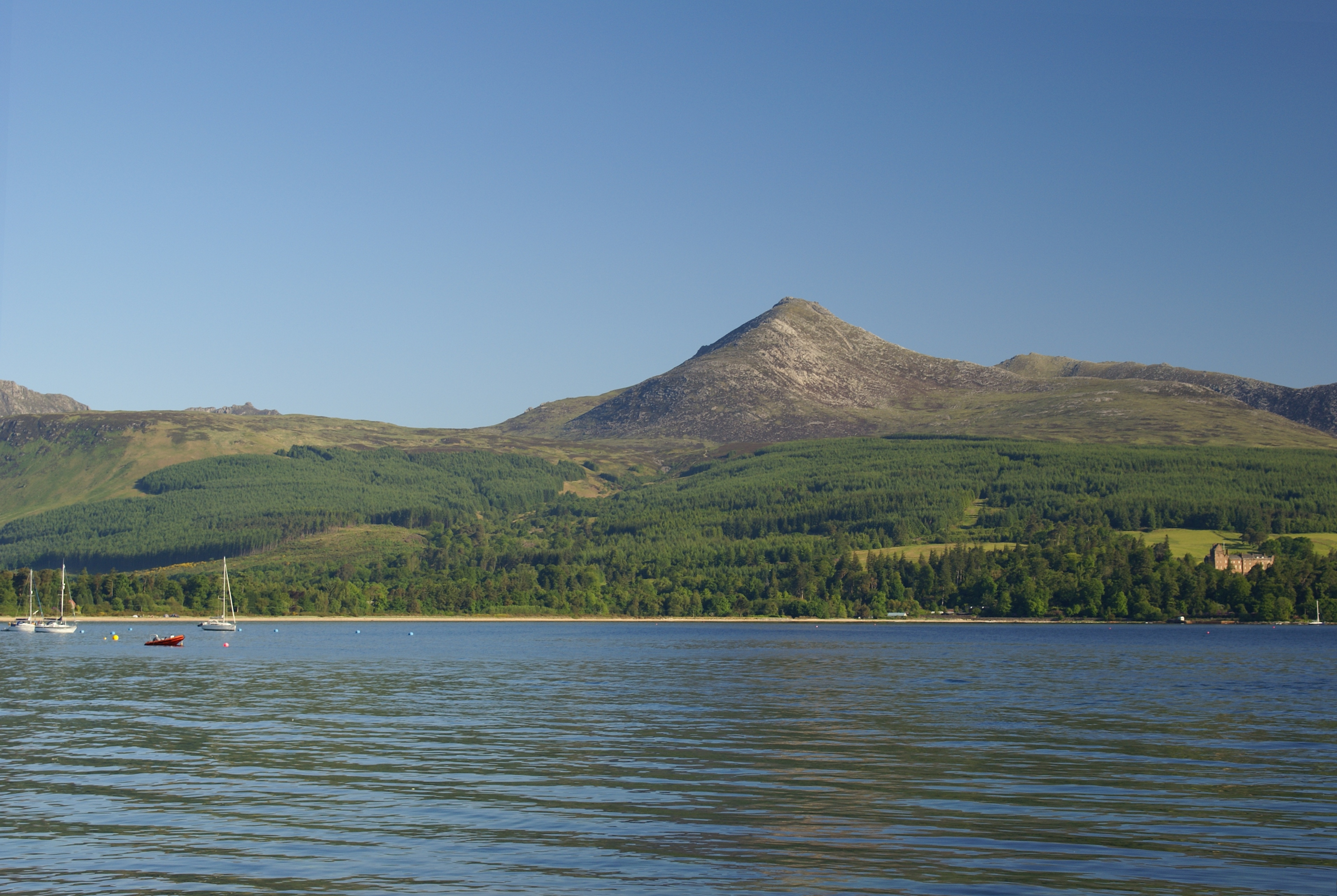
Goatfell from Brodick Harbour

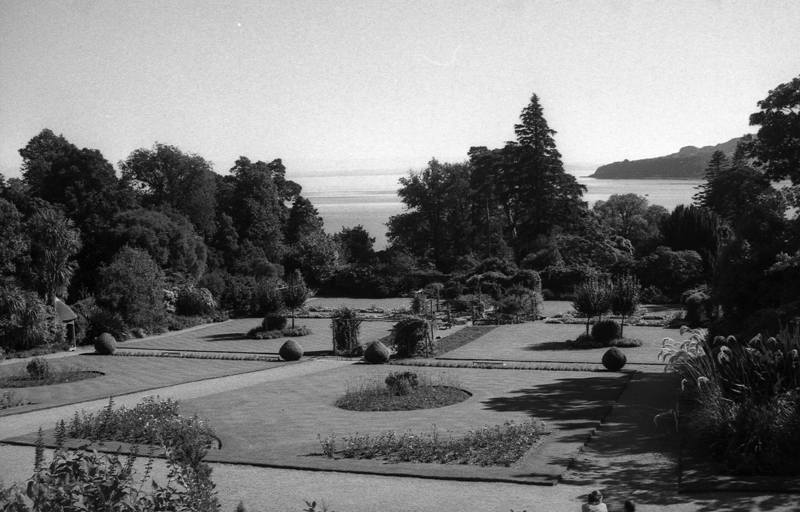
Brodick Castle Grounds - Black & White

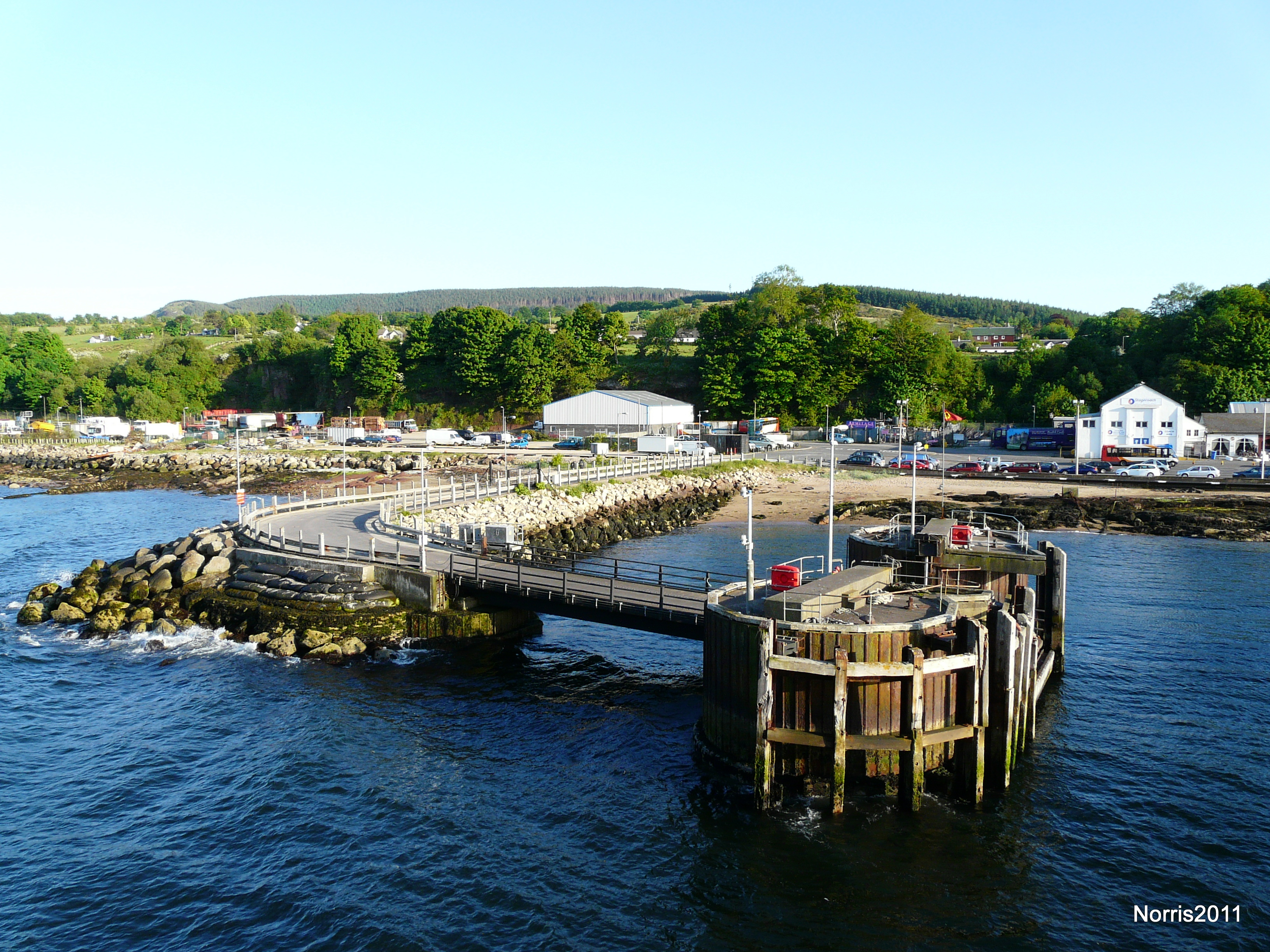
Brodick Terminal - Original Pier

== Brodick Castle ==
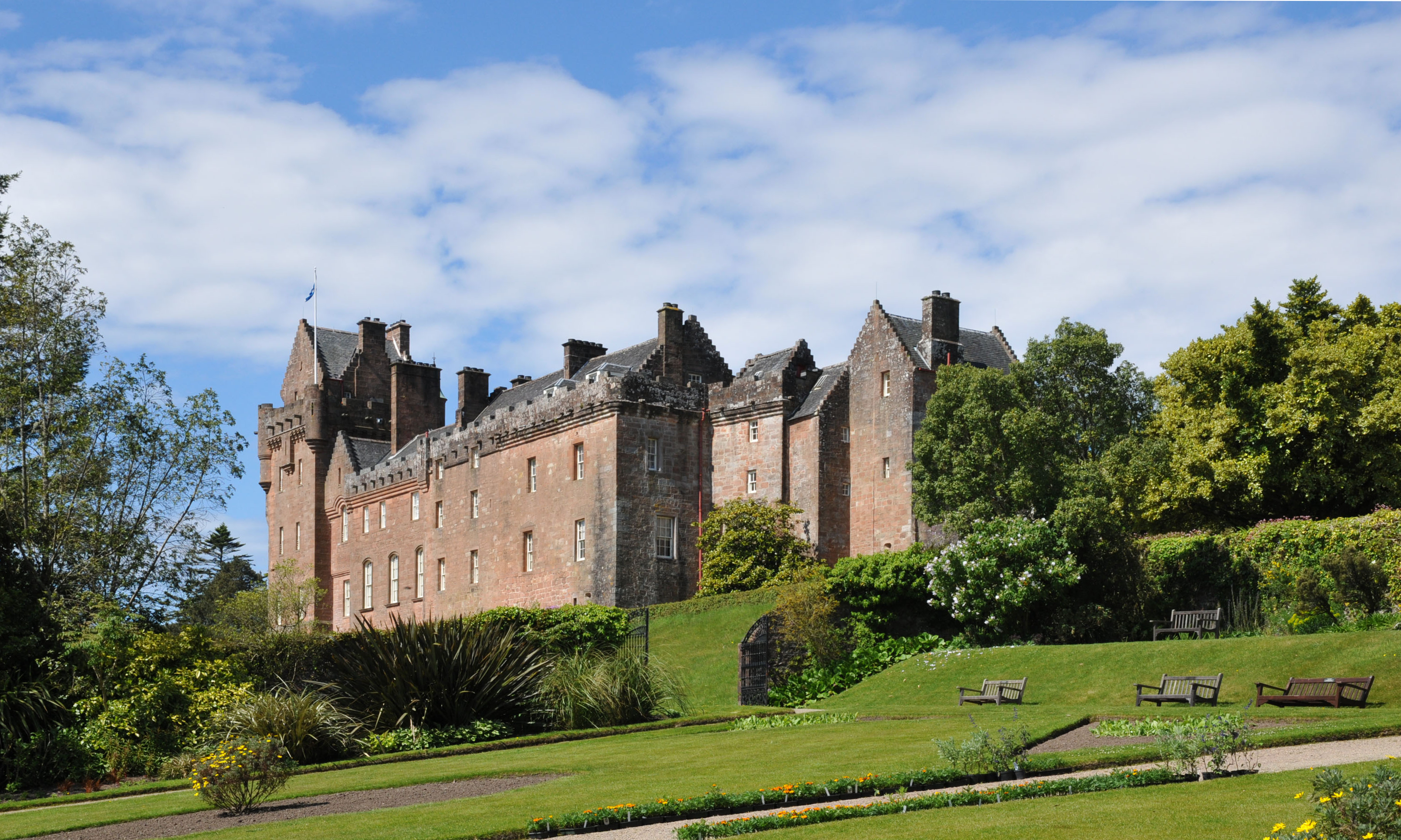
Brodick Castle

Brodick Castle was previously a seat of the Dukes of Hamilton, but is now owned by the National Trust for Scotland. A new Kids adventure section of the park opened in July 2017.
