= MV Ulster Prince =

MV Ulster Prince is the name of the following ships:

- MV Ulster Prince (1929), wrecked in 1941
- MV Ulster Prince (1937), formally MV Leinster, renamed MV Odysseus in 1967, scrapped in 1980
- MV Ulster Prince (1966), scrapped in 2004

== See also ==
- MV Ulster Monarch
- MV Ulster Queen
- Ulster Prince (disambiguation)
