= List of ship launches in 1929 =

The list of ship launches in 1929 is a chronological list of ships launched in 1929.

Date	Ship	Class	Builder	Location	Country	Notes
23 January	Salt Lake City	Pensacola-class cruiser	New York Shipbuilding Corporation	Camden, New Jersey	United States	For United States Navy
24 January	Highland Hope	Passenger ship	Harland & Wolff	Belfast	United Kingdom	For H. & W. Nelson Ltd.
24 January	Ulster Monarch	Ferry	Harland & Wolff	Belfast	United Kingdom	For Ulster Steamship Co.
25 January	Cardiff	Cargo ship	Harland & Wolff	Belfast	United Kingdom	For Argentine Navigation Co.
20 February	C-3	C-class submarine	SECN	Cartagena	Spain	For Spanish Navy
20 February	Milwaukee	Passenger ship	Blohm + Voss	Hamburg	Germany	For Hamburg-Amerikanische Packetfahrt-Actien-Gesellschaft.
26 February	Glasgow	Cargo ship	Harland & Wolff	Belfast	United Kingdom	For Argentine Navigation Co.
6 March	Dolly Kühling	Fishing trawler	Schiffswerft von Henry Koch AG	Lübeck	Germany	For Hochseefisherei J Wieting AG
25 March	I-59 (I-159)	Kaidai III-type submarine	Yokosuka Naval Arsenal	Yokosuka	Japan	For Imperial Japanese Navy
28 March	Ulster Queen	Ferry	Harland & Wolff	Belfast	United Kingdom	For Belfast Steamship Co.
10 April	Actéon	Redoutable-class submarine	Ateliers et Chantiers de la Loire	Saint-Nazaire	France	For French Navy
10 April	Henri Poincaré	Redoutable-class submarine	Arsenal de Lorient	Lorient	France	For French Navy
10 April	Poncelet	Redoutable-class submarine	Arsenal de Lorient	Lorient	France	For French Navy
11 April	Argo	Redoutable-class submarine	Chantiers Dubigeon	Nantes	France	For French Navy
11 April	Highland Princess	Passenger ship	Harland & Wolff	Belfast	United Kingdom	For H. & W. Nelson Ltd.
12 April	Commandant Teste	Seaplane carrier and tender	Chantiers de la Gironde	Gironde	France	For French Navy
23 April	Baron Vernon	Cargo ship	Harland & Wolff	Belfast	United Kingdom	For H. Hogarth & Sons.
23 April	Tamare	Tanker	Harland & Wolff	Belfast	United Kingdom	For Lago Shipping Co.
24 April	Anthony	A-class destroyer	Scotts Shipbuilding and Engineering Company	Greenock, Scotland	United Kingdom	For Royal Navy
24 April	I-60	Kaidai III-type submarine	Sasebo Naval Arsenal	Sasebo	Japan	For Imperial Japanese Navy
25 April	Pensacola	Pensacola-class cruiser	New York Navy Yard	Brooklyn, New York	United States	
25 April	Ulster Prince	Ferry	Harland & Wolff	Belfast	United Kingdom	For Belfast Steamship Co.
25 April	Westralia	Refrigerated cargo ship	Harland & Wolff	Belfast	United Kingdom	For Huddart Parker.
30 April	Ule	Tanker	Harland & Wolff	Belfast	United Kingdom	For Lago shipping Co.
9 May	Surinam	Tanker	Harland & Wolff	Belfast	United Kingdom	For Lago Shipping Co.
15 May	Fernglen	Cargo ship	Akers Mekaniske Verksted	Oslo	Norway	For Fearnley & Eger
22 May	Itsukushima	minelayer	Uraga Dock	Uraga	Japan	For Imperial Japanese Navy
6 June	Lochness	Ferry	Harland & Wolff	Govan	United Kingdom	For David MacBrayne & Co.
8 June	Fresnel	Redoutable-class submarine	Ateliers et Chantiers de Saint-Nazaire Penhoët	Saint-Nazaire	France	For French Navy
10 June	Irwin	Ferry	Harland & Wolff	Belfast	United Kingdom	For South Indian Railway.
13 June	Baron Ramsey	Cargo ship	Harland & Wolff	Belfast	United Kingdom	For H. Hogarth & Sons.
19 June	Kavak	Cargo ship	Harland & Wolff	Belfast	United Kingdom	For Moss Steamship Co.
26 June	Ardent	A-class destroyer	Scotts Shipbuilding and Engineering Company	Greenock, Scotland	United Kingdom	
27 June	Goschen	Ferry	Harland & Wolff	Belfast	United Kingdom	For South Indian Railway
29 June	Dahohmian	Cargo ship	Northumberland Shipbuilding Company	Howden-on-Tyne	United Kingdom	For United Africa Company
29 June	Lichtenfels	heavy lift ship	Deschimag Werk A.G	Bremen	Germany	For DDG Hansa
June	Gustav Adolf Kühling	Fishing trawler	Deutsche Schiff- und Maschinenbau	Wesermünde	Germany	For Hochseefisherei J Wieting AG
June	Tai Ping	cargo ship	Kockums	Malmö	Sweden	For Wilh. Wilhelmsen
3 July	Chester	Northampton-class cruiser	New York Shipbuilding Corporation	Camden, New Jersey	United States	For United States Navy
4 July	Llangibby Castle	Passenger ship	Harland & Wolff	Govan	United Kingdom	For Union-Castle Line
6 July	C-4	C-class submarine	SECN	Cartagena	Spain	For Spanish Navy
9 July	Active	A-class destroyer	Hawthorn Leslie & Company	Hebburn, Newcastle upon Tyne	United Kingdom	
27 July	Antelope	A-class destroyer	Hawthorn Leslie & Company	Tyneside	United Kingdom	
6 August	Achéron	Redoutable-class submarine	Ateliers et Chantiers de la Loire	Saint-Nazaire	France	For French Navy
6 August	Britannic	Ocean liner	Harland and Wolff	Belfast	United Kingdom	For White Star Line
8 August	Codrington	A-class destroyer	Swan Hunter	Wallsend, Tyne and Wear	United Kingdom	
8 August	Acasta	A-class destroyer	John Brown & Company	Clydebank	United Kingdom	
21 August	Kufra	Cargo ship	Harland & Wolff	Belfast	United Kingdom	For James Moss & Co.
22 August	Arrow	A-class destroyer	Vickers-Armstrongs,	Barrow-in-Furness	United Kingdom	
22 August	Cuidad de Ascuncion	Cargo ship	Harland & Wolff	Belfast	United Kingdom	For Argentine Navigation Co..
22 August	Kana	Cargo ship	Harland & Wolff	Belfast	United Kingdom	For Moss Steamship Co.
August	Georg Adolf Kühling	Fishing trawler	Deutsche Schiff- und Maschinenbau	Wesermünde	Germany	For Hochseefisherei J Wieting AG
August	William Kipping	Tanker barge	J. Harker Ltd.	Knottingley	United Kingdom	For J.Harker Ltd.
5 September	Northampton	Northampton-class cruiser	Fore River Shipyard	Quincy, Massachusetts	United States	For United States Navy
6 September	Ardanbhan	Cargo ship	Harland & Wolff	Belfast	United Kingdom	For Clarke & Service Ltd.
7 September	Houston	Northampton-class cruiser	Newport News Shipbuilding & Dry Dock Company	Newport News, Virginia	United States	For United States Navy
14 September	Rabat	Cargo ship	Deutsche Werft	Finkenwerder	Germany	For Oldenburg-Portugiesische Dampfschiffs-Reederei.
2 October	Knight of Malta	Cargo liner	Swan, Hunter & Wigham Richardson Ltd	Newcastle upon Tyne	United Kingdom	For Cassar Co. Ltd.
4 October	Achates	A-class destroyer	John Brown & Company	Clydebank	United Kingdom	
18 October	Leipzig	Leipzig-class cruiser	Reichsmarinewerft	Wilhelmshaven	Germany	
24 October	Amberes	Cargo ship	Harland & Wolff	Belfast	United Kingdom	For Argentine Navigation Co.
24 October	David Livingstone	Cargo ship	Harland & Wolff	Belfast	United Kingdom	For British & African Steamship Co.
28 October	C-5	C-class submarine	SECN	Cartagena	Spain	For Spanish Navy
30 October	Oscar Neynaber	Fishing trawler	Schiffsbau Gesellschaft Unterweser	Unterweser-Lehe	Germany	For Kohlenburg & Putz Seefischerei AG
31 October	Dorothy Rose	Cargo ship	Harland & Wolff	Belfast	United Kingdom	For Richard Hughes & Co.
31 October	Dunbar Castle	Passenger ship	Harland & Wolff	Belfast	United Kingdom	For Union-Castle Line.
1 November	Carmen Avellaneda	Train ferry	Harland & Wolff	Belfast	United Kingdom	For Entre Ríos Railway Co.
19 November	Winchester Castle	Passenger ship	Harland & Wolff	Belfast	United Kingdom	For Union-Castle Line.
4 December	Dudley Rose	Cargo ship	Harland & Wolff	Belfast	United Kingdom	For Richard Hughes & Co.
17 December	Achimota	Passenger ship	Harland & Wolff	Belfast	United Kingdom	For Huddart Parker.
18 December	Mary Slessor	Cargo ship	Harland & Wolff	Belfast	United Kingdom	For British & African Steamship Co.
19 December	Barcelona	Cargo ship	Harland & Wolff	Belfast	United Kingdom	For Argentine Navigation Co.
26 December	C-6	C-class submarine	SECN	Cartagena	Spain	For Spanish Navy
Date unknown	Athelviscount	Tanker	R. Duncan & Co. Ltd	Port Glasgow	United Kingdom	For United Molasses Co. Ltd.
Date unknown	Audacite	Tug	Abdela & Mitchell Ltd.	Brimscombe	United Kingdom	For Medway Oil & Storage Co. Ltd.
Date unknown	Barøy	Cargo liner	Trondhjems mekaniske Værksted	Trondheim	Norway	
Date unknown	Blackwater	Dredger	Alabama Drydock and Shipbuilding Company	Mobile, Alabama	United States	For United States Army Corps of Engineers.
Date unknown	Blairspey	Cargo ship	Ardrossan Dockyard Co.	Ardrossan	United Kingdom	For Geo. Nisbet & Co. Ltd.
Date unknown	Ceuta	Cargo ship	Deutsche Werft	Hamburg	Germany	For Oldenburg-Portugiesische Dampfschiffs-Reederei
Date unknown	Cobargo	Coaster	Ailsa Shipbuilding Co Ltd.	Troon	United Kingdom	For Illawarra & South Coast Steam Navigation Company.
Date unknown	Cormooring	Mooring vessel	Aldous Ltd.	Brightlingsea	United Kingdom	For Cory Lighterage Ltd.
Date unknown	Eastern Prince	Cargo liner	Napier & Miller Ltd.	Glasgow	United Kingdom	For Furness, Withy & Co. Ltd.
Date unknown	Escaut	Cargo ship	J. Smit	Alblasserdam	Netherlands	For Wm. Muller & Co.
Date unknown	Evalana	Fishing trawler	Otto Anderson & Co. (London) Ltd.	Wivenhoe	United Kingdom	For Boston Deep Sea Fishing & Ice Co. Ltd.
Date unknown	F. 34	Tank barge	Alabama Drydock and Shipbuilding Company	Mobile, Alabama	United States	For Alabama Drydock and Shipbuilding Company.
Date unknown	Hercules	Cargo ship	AG Weser	Bremen	Germany	For Dampfschiffahrts-Gesellschaft Neptun
Date unknown	Imari	Cargo ship	Swan, Hunter & Wigham Richardson Ltd.	Newcastle upon Tyne	United Kingdom	For private owner.
Date unknown	J. F. Schröder	Fishing trawler	Schiffbau-Gesellschaft Unterweser	Wesermünde	Germany	For Deutsche Hochsee Fischerei Bremen-Cuxhaven AG
Date unknown	Marie Richardson	Fishing trawler	NV IJsselwerft	Gorinchem	Netherlands	For Deutscher Fischerei Gesellschaft AG
Date unknown	Max Albrecht	Tanker	Kockums Mekaniske Verkstad.	Malmö	Sweden	For Max Albrecht Kommandit.
Date unknown	Northern Prince	Cargo ship	Lithgows Ltd.	Port Glasgow	United Kingdom	For Prince Line.
Date unknown	Southern Prince	Cargo ship	Lithgows Ltd.	Port Glasgow	United Kingdom	For Prince Line.
Date unknown	Suzanna	Sailing ship	J. Bolson & Son Ltd.	Poole	United Kingdom	For private owner.
Date unknown	Trustie	Tug	Abdela & Mitchell Ltd.	Brimscombe	United Kingdom	For Medway Oil & Storage Co. Ltd.
Date unknown	Vikingen	Factory ship	Swan, Hunter & Wigham Richardson Ltd.	Newcastle upon Tynt	United Kingdom	For private owner.
Date unknown	Vikingen I	Whaler	Smiths Dock Co Ltd	Middlesbrough	United Kingdom	For private owner.
Date unknown	Vikingen II	Whaler	Smiths Dock Co Ltd	Middlesbrough	United Kingdom	For private owner.
Date unknown	Vikingen III	Whaler	Smiths Dock Co Ltd	Middlesbrough	United Kingdom	For private owner.
Date unknown	Volkswohl	Fishing trawler	Deutsche Werke AG	Kiel	Germany	For Deutsche Hochsee Fischerei Bremen-Cuxhaven AG
Date unknown	Yngve	Schooner		Björkenäs, Sweden	Sweden	
