= MV Ulster Queen (1967) =

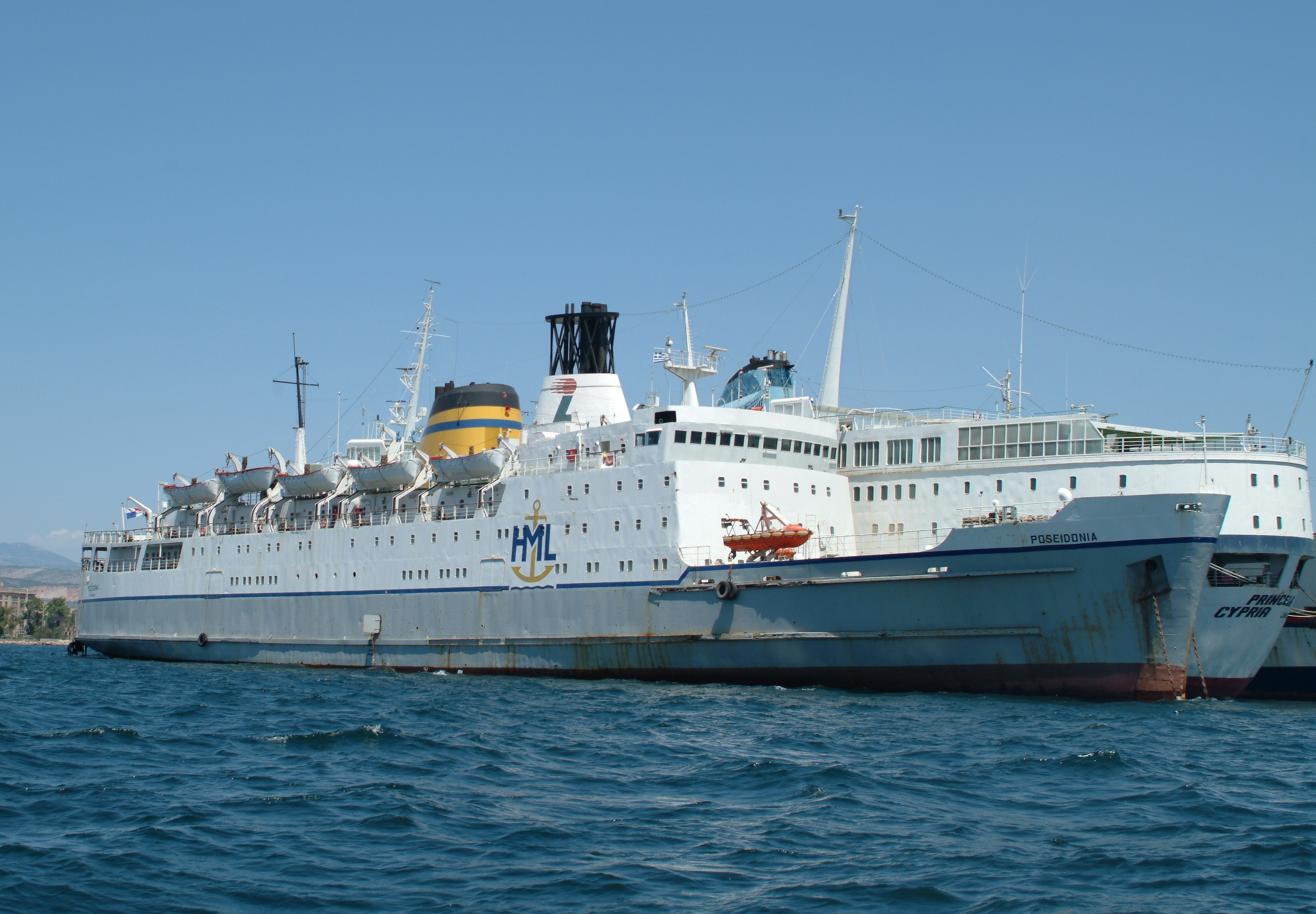
- Ulster Queen as Poseidonia laid up in Eleusis in 2004.

History
- Name: Ulster Queen (1967-1982); Med Sea (1982-86) (unregistered); Al Kahera (1986-87; Ala-Eddin (1987-88); Poseidonia (1988-2005); Al Kahfain (2005)
- Owner: Hellenic Mediterranean Lines (1988-2005); Pangloss Bav. Co. Ltd. (1982-1988); P&O Ferries Ltd (1978-1982); Belfast Steamship Co (1967-1978)
- Operator: P&O Ferries (1978-81)
- Route: Liverpool-Belfast (1967-1981)
- Builder: Cammell Laird
- Yard number: 1323
- Completed: 23 May 1967
- In service: 6 June 1967
- Out of service: 7 November 1981
- Identification: IMO number: 6703317
- Fate: Wrecked on Hyndman Reef, Safaga 2005

General characteristics
- Tonnage: 4,270 GT
- Length: 115.22 m (378.0 ft)
- Beam: 16.46 m (54.0 ft)
- Draught: 4.13 m (13.5 ft)
- Installed power: 2x 12-cylinder, Pielstick diesel; 5295 kW.
- Speed: 15 knots (28 km/h; 17 mph)
- Capacity: 274 1st class passengers; 138 2nd class (cabin); 598 2nd class (seats)

MV Ulster Queen was a passenger ferry operated across the Irish Sea by P&O Ferries between 1967 and 1981.

== History ==
Ulster Queen was the second of three new car ferries delivered to Coast Lines in 1966/67 to update the Irish Sea services of the Belfast Steamship Company. She was built by Cammell Laird in Birkenhead. With her sister, Ulster Prince she took over the Liverpool - Belfast night service, replacing the pre-war motorships Ulster Monarch and Ulster Prince (2). The smaller, third new ferry, Lion took over the Ardrossan - Belfast day service of Burns & Laird. Coast Lines were taken over by P&O in 1971 and the ferries subsequently took on the P&O Ferries colours, with pale blue funnels.

The service closed in 1981 and both ships were laid up in Ostend. Ulster Queen saw further service as Med Sea, Al Kahera and Ala-Eddin. In 1988, she was bought by Hellenic Mediterranean Lines, and renamed Poseidonia.

On 2 November 2005, she caught fire during a voyage from Suez to Jeddah. One crew member was lost. The following day, she sank on Hyndman Reef, Safaga and lies as a wreck.

== Service ==
- 1967-1981: Liverpool-Belfast
- 1982-1985: Cyprus - Syria
- 1986: Red Sea
- 1988-2003 : Igoumenitsa - Brindisi (1988-1998)
