= Ulster Prince (1966 ship) =

Passenger ferry

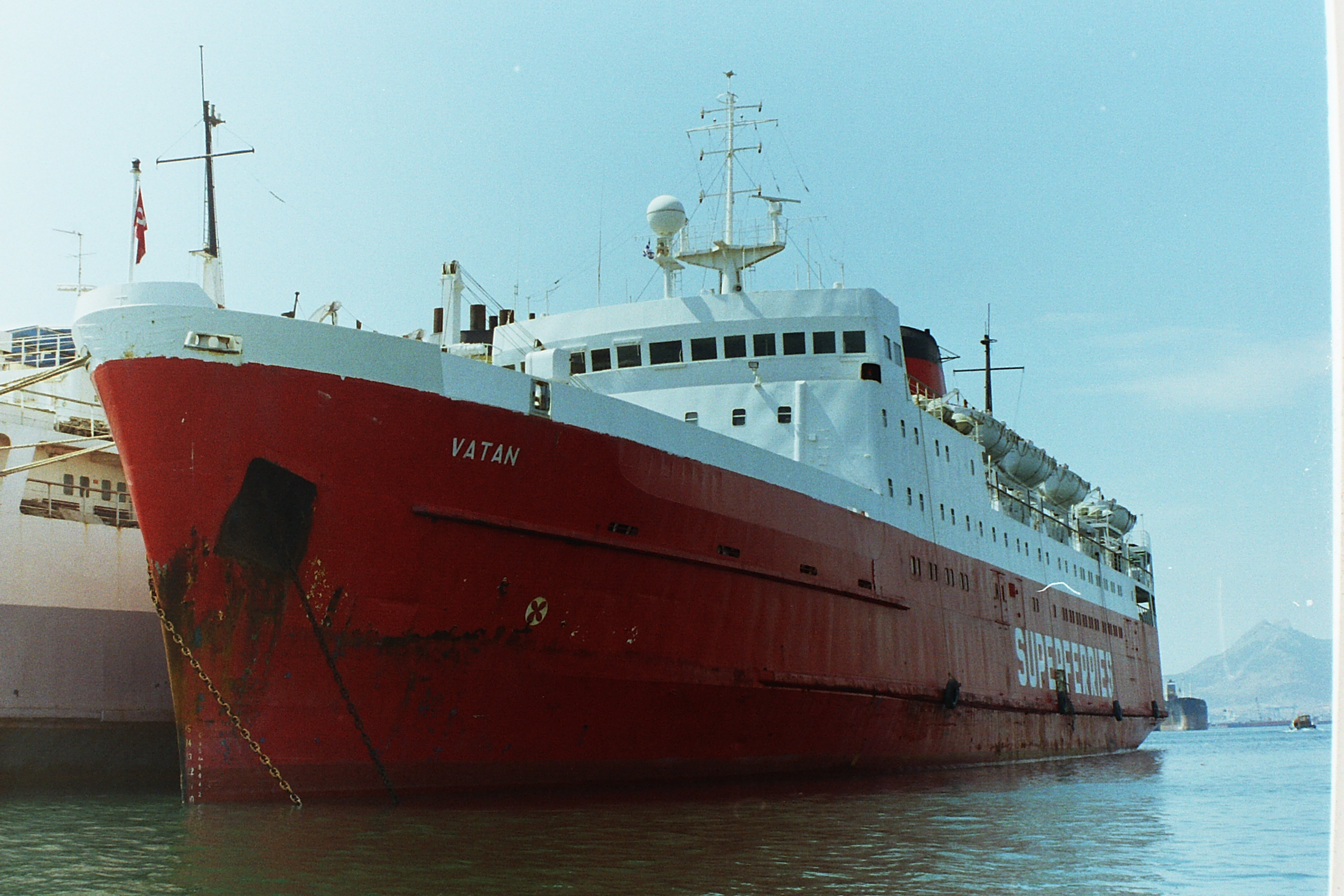
- Ulster Prince as Vatan in Eleusis in 2000.

History
- Name: 1967–1982: Ulster Prince; 1982–1984: Lady M; 1984–1986: Tangapakorn; 1986–1988: Long Hu; 1988–1995: Macmosa; 1995–1995: Neptuna; 1995–2000: Panter; 2000–2000: Vatan; 2000–2000: Manar
- Owner: 1967–1978: Belfast Steamship Co; 1978–1982: P&O Ferries Ltd; 1982: Panmar Ferries Services, Nicosia; 1984: Varsity SA, Panama; 1988: Shun Tak Enterprises, Macau; 1995–2004: Hellenic Mediterranean Lines
- Operator: P&O Ferries (1978–1981)
- Route: Liverpool-Belfast (1967–1981)
- Builder: Harland and Wolff
- Yard number: 1667
- Launched: 13 October 1966
- Completed: 6 April 1967
- Maiden voyage: 18 April 1967
- Out of service: 7 November 1981
- Identification: IMO number: 6622587
- Fate: Scrapped 2004

General characteristics
- Tonnage: 4,478 GT
- Length: 113.7 m (373.0 ft)
- Beam: 16.5 m (54.1 ft)
- Draught: 4.16 m (13.6 ft)
- Installed power: 2x 12 Cylinder Pielstick Diesel; 2663-5368 kW
- Propulsion: Twin screw
- Speed: 17.5 knots (32.4 km/h; 20.1 mph)
- Capacity: 274 1st class passengers; 138 2nd class (cabin); 598 2nd class (seats); 230 cars
- Crew: 85

MV Ulster Prince was a passenger ferry operated across the Irish Sea by P&O Ferries between 1967 and 1981. She was sold for further service in the Mediterranean and Far East and was scrapped in 2004.

== History ==
Ulster Prince was the first of three new car ferries delivered to Coast Lines in 1966/67 to update the Irish Sea services of the Belfast Steamship Company. She was built by Harland and Wolff, launched in 1966 and with her sister, Ulster Queen took over the Liverpool - Belfast night service, replacing the pre-war motorships Ulster Monarch and Ulster Prince (2). The third new ship, Lion was smaller and took over the Ardrossan - Belfast day service of Burns & Laird. In 1971, Coast Lines were taken over by P&O and the ferries took on the P&O Ferries colours, with pale blue funnels. The service closed in 1981 and Ulster Prince was laid up in Ostend.

In 1982, Ulster Prince was sold to Panmar Ferries Services of Nicosia, Cyprus, and left for service in the Mediterranean. From 1983, she saw service in the Far East. In 1995, she was bought by Hellenic Mediterranean Lines and renamed Neptunia, but later the same year was in use as Panther for Hellenic Orient Lines between Bari and Çeşme. In 2000, she was named Vatan and then Manar, the latter for Al Thuraya Marine Service Company of Dubai between Port Rashid and Umm Qasr, Iraq.

Her end came in March 2004 when she was sold to Indian breakers. She arrived at Alang on 3 April 2004.

== Service ==
- 1967–1981: Liverpool–Belfast
- 1983: Patras–Igoumenitsa–Ancona
- 1984: Hong Kong–China
- 1988: Macau–Taiwan
- 1995: Bari–Çeşme
- 1996: Patras–Igoumenitsa–Brindisi
- 2001–2004: Port Rashid–Umm Qasr, Iraq
