= Leinster (1937 ship) =

Passenger ferry

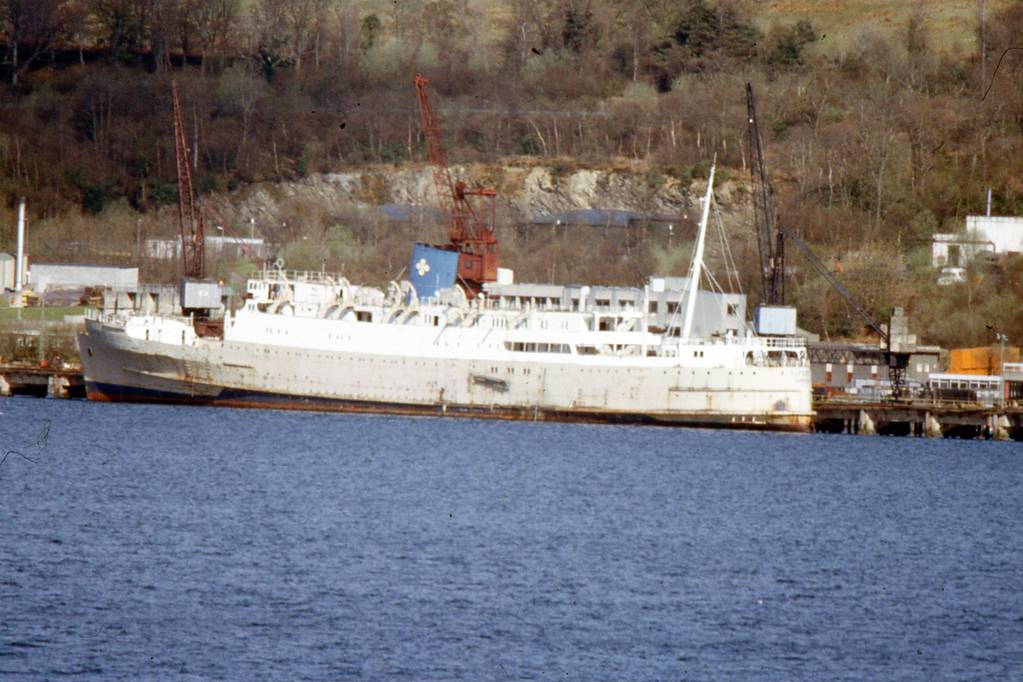
- Odysseus at Faslane in 1979.

History
- Name: MV Leinster (1937-46); MV Ulster Prince (2) (1946-66); MV Ulster Prince 1 (1966-67); MV Odysseus (1967-80)
- Namesake: Leinster
- Owner: British and Irish Steam Packet Company; Epirotiki Line
- Port of registry: Liverpool
- Route: Liverpool-Dublin (1937-1946)
- Builder: Harland and Wolff
- Yard number: 995
- Launched: 24 June 1937
- Completed: 2 November 1937
- Maiden voyage: 1937
- In service: 1937
- Out of service: 1980
- Identification: Official No.164343; IMO number: 5372563
- Fate: Scrapped in 1980

General characteristics
- Tonnage: 4,302 GRT
- Length: 345 ft (105.2 m)
- Beam: 50 ft (15.2 m)
- Draught: 4.13 m (13.5 ft)
- Installed power: Single acting diesel
- Propulsion: Twin screws
- Speed: 17 knots (31 km/h; 20 mph)

MV Leinster was a passenger ferry operated across the Irish Sea between 1937 and 1966. She was renamed Ulster Prince to replace the 1929 motorship of that name, lost during WWII.

== History ==
MV Leinster was a passenger ship built by Harland and Wolff for the British and Irish Steam Packet Company in 1937. She was initially chartered to Belfast Steamship Company for the Belfast - Liverpool service, until a new terminal was completed at Dublin. Leinster and her sister MV Munster took up their intended service between Liverpool and Dublin in 1938. They were the largest vessels in the Coast Lines fleet and were to prove too large for that route. Their original buff hulls were later changed to dark green. The new ferries did not have capacity for cattle, an important cargo on the Dublin route. Two cattle carriers were built in 1937: Kilkenny (1,320 tons from the Liffey Dockyard), and Dundalk (630 tons from Ardrossan, Scotland).

Shortly after the outbreak of World War II, the B&I ships were removed from their normal routes. Leinster was converted into a hospital ship and then a troop carrier. After the war, she was refitted and renamed Ulster Prince (2) for the Liverpool - Belfast service, along with Ulster Queen, the only one of the 1929/30 trio to return from war service.

In 1966, she was renamed Ulster Prince I to make way for her replacement Ulster Prince. After her withdrawal in October 1966, the service was provided by MV Irish Coast and MV Scottish Coast until the new car ferries arrived.

In 1967, she was sold to Epirotiki Line and renamed Odysseus. By 1976, she was used as accommodation at Kyle of Lochalsh, and later at Glasgow. She was scrapped at Faslane in 1980.

== Service ==
- Liverpool - Belfast (1937)
- Liverpool - Dublin (1937–46)
- Liverpool - Belfast (1946–66)
