= Munster (1937) =

Passenger ferry

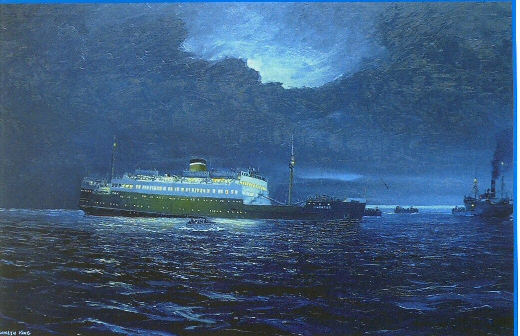
- Munster mined approaching Liverpool

History
- Name: MV Munster (1937-40)
- Namesake: Munster
- Owner: British and Irish Steam Packet Company
- Port of registry: Liverpool
- Route: Liverpool-Dublin (1938-1940)
- Builder: Harland and Wolff
- Yard number: 996
- Launched: 3 November 1937
- Completed: 22 February 1938
- Identification: Official No.166226
- Fate: Sank in 1940

General characteristics
- Class & type: Passenger ship
- Tonnage: 4,302 GRT
- Length: 345 ft (105.2 m)
- Beam: 50 ft (15.2 m)
- Draught: 4.13 m (13.5 ft)
- Installed power: 2 x Single Acting (S.A.) Diesel 1347 n.h.p.
- Propulsion: Twin screws
- Speed: 17 knots (31 km/h; 20 mph)

MV Munster was a passenger ferry operated by the British and Irish Steam Packet Company from 1938 to 1940. She was sunk by a mine during WWII.

== History ==
MV Munster was a passenger ship built by Harland and Wolff for the British and Irish Steam Packet Company in 1937. She and her sister MV Leinster took up their intended service between Liverpool and Dublin in 1938. Their original buff hulls were later changed to dark green. Although they were the largest vessels in the Coast Lines fleet, they did not have capacity for cattle on the Dublin route. Two cattle carriers were added to the fleet: Kilkenny (1,320 tons from the Liffey Dockyard), and Dundalk (630 tons from Ardrossan, Scotland).

Whilst on the Belfast to Liverpool run on 7 February 1940, Munster triggered a magnetic mine near the Liverpool Bar at 6 am, laid by German submarine U-30. Munster sank; all 250 aboard were rescued, although one died later.

== Service ==
- Liverpool - Dublin (1937–40)
