= MV Ulster Queen =

MV Ulster Queen is the name of the following ships:

- MV Ulster Queen (1930), a motorship
- MV Ulster Queen (1967), a ferry
