= HMS Stephen Furness =

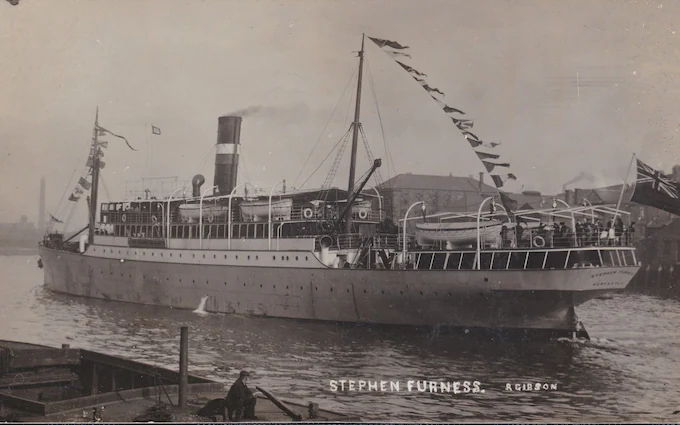

History

United Kingdom
- Name: Stephen Furness
- Owner: Tyne Tees Steam Shipping Company
- Port of registry: United Kingdom
- Route: Newcastle–London
- Builder: Irvine's Shipbuilding & Drydock Company, West Hartlepool
- Launched: 10 May 1910
- Acquired: by Royal Navy during the First World War
- Fate: Sunk, 13 December 1917

General characteristics
- Tonnage: 1,712 GRT
- Length: 290 ft (88 m)
- Beam: 37 ft (11 m)
- Depth: 16 ft (4.9 m) to main deck
- Crew: More than 100 in Royal Navy service

HMS Stephen Furness was a Royal Navy armed boarding steamer of the First World War. She was built as a passenger vessel for the Tyne Tees Steam Shipping Company (TTSSC) by Irvine's Shipbuilding & Drydock Company of West Hartlepool. She was named after TTSSC chairman Sir Stephen Furness, 1st Baronet and launched in 1910. She served on the Newcastle–London route until the First World War when she was acquired by the navy. She served on the route to Murmansk, Russia, but was sunk by a U-boat in 1917 while traversing the North Channel 10 miles east of the entrance to Strangford Lough, Northern Ireland. More than 100 men died in her sinking.

== Construction and commercial service ==
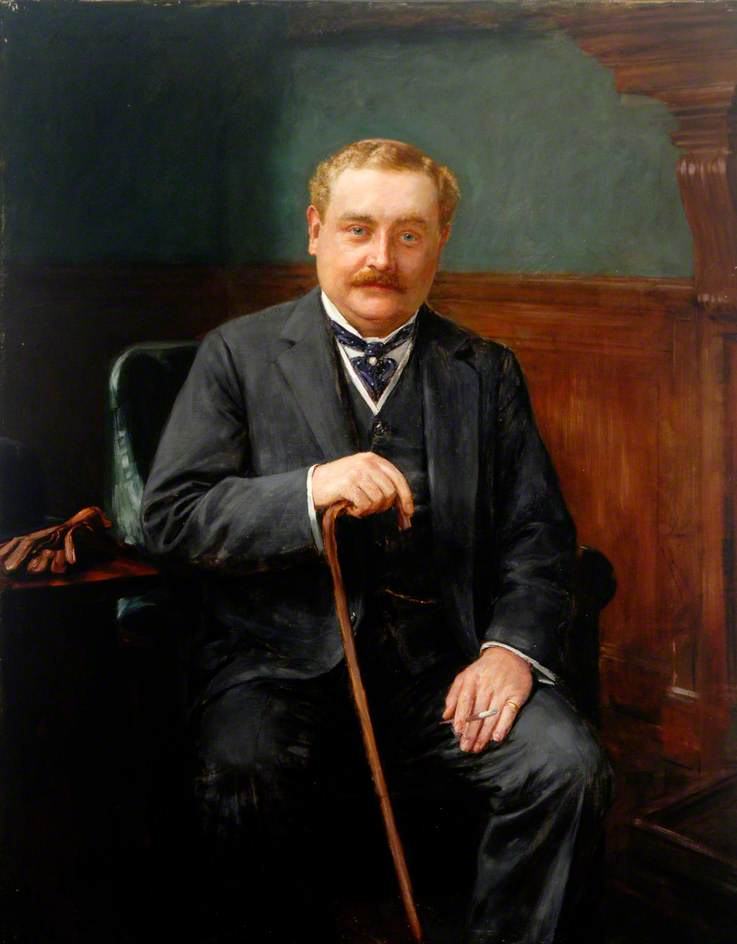
The ship's namesake, Sir Stephen Furness

The Stephen Furness was ordered by the Tyne Tees Steam Shipping Company (TTSSC) as a larger replacement for the New Londoner, on the Newcastle-London passenger route. The larger capacity steamer Richard Welford had joined the New Londoner on the route a few years before and TTSSC were looking for a vessel of comparable size. Tenders were invited in October 1909 and the bidding process was won by Irvine's Shipbuilding & Drydock Company of West Hartlepool for a price of £43,500.

The vessel was named after TTSSC chairman Sir Stephen Furness, 1st Baronet and was launched by his wife on 10 May 1910. The Stephen Furness was 290 feet (88 m) in length, 37 feet (11 m) in breadth and measured 16 feet (4.9 m) in depth to her main deck. She was of 1,712 gross register tonnage and 745 net register tonnage.

A steam vessel, Stephen Furness also had an electric generator which powered lights and cooling fans. She also featured a shelter deck while her predecessors had had open forecastles. Below decks she had a cargo hold at the fore and aft with a central engine room, separated by watertight bulkheads. The passenger accommodation was of a high standard for the time and Stephen Furness could carry 250 first-class and 120 second-class passengers. She featured a dining room at the front of her bridge deck as well as a smoking room and a bar.

Stephen Furness served temporarily on a route to Hamburg, Germany, before she replaced New Londoner on the Newcastle-London route in January 1911.

== Royal Navy service ==
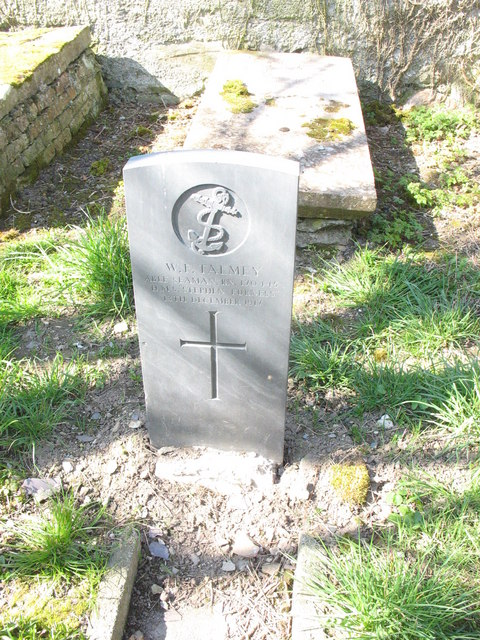
Grave of Able Seaman W.F. Talmey at Llanfair-yng-Nghornwy, North Wales, a member of the crew whose body was recovered

After the outbreak of the First World War in 1914 the vessel was converted to an armed boarding steamer and taken into Royal Navy service as a commissioned vessel, HMS Stephen Furness. She carried the pendant number M(I)23. She carried a part military and part merchant marine crew.

In mid-April 1916 Stephen Furness was deployed, with fellow armed boarding steamer HMS Carron, on the route from Britain to Murmansk, which was the only available ice-free port for carrying supplies to Britain's ally Russia.

In early December 1917 Stephen Furness was proceeding from Lerwick, Scotland, to Liverpool, England, for repairs. On 13 December she was spotted by German submarine UB-64 while in the North Channel, 10 miles east of the entrance to Strangford Lough, Northern Ireland. The U-boat launched a single torpedo which struck the Stephen Furness between her bridge and funnel. The vessel sank quickly, before her lifeboats could be launched, leading to the deaths of 6 of her officers and 95 crew. There were 12 survivors. Among the crew were five members of the Royal Naval Canadian Volunteer Reserve who are commemorated on the Halifax Memorial.

== Rediscovery of wreck ==
The Ship's wreckage was rediscovered by a team from Bangor University and revealed in 2024.
