= Ulster Prince (1929 ship) =

History
- Name: MV Ulster Prince (1929-1940); HMT Ulster Prince (1940-1941)
- Owner: Belfast Steamship Company
- Port of registry: Belfast
- Route: Liverpool-Belfast (1930-1940)
- Builder: Harland and Wolff
- Yard number: 697
- Launched: 25 April 1929
- Completed: 3 March 1930
- Identification: Official No.161858
- Fate: wrecked in 1941

General characteristics
- Tonnage: 3,756 GRT
- Length: 345 ft (105.2 m)
- Beam: 46 ft (14.0 m)
- Draught: 4.13 m (13.5 ft)
- Installed power: 10 cylinder airless injection H&W B&W
- Propulsion: Twin screws
- Speed: 17 knots (31 km/h; 20 mph)

MV Ulster Prince was a passenger ferry operated across the Irish Sea between 1929 and 1940. She became a total loss in Greece while a troop ship during WWII.

== History ==
Ulster Prince was the last of three 3700ton motorships built by Harland and Wolff for the Belfast Steamship Co. between 1929 and 1930. She and her sisters, Ulster Monarch and Ulster Queen, were pioneer diesel-propelled cross-channel passenger ships. The trio provided a reliable and regular overnight service between Liverpool and Belfast, which was marketed as the Ulster Imperial Line. Their original grey hulls were later changed to black.

Ulster Prince was used as a troop ship during WWII, and became H. M. T. Ulster Prince. In 1940, she landed troops in Iceland for the occupation of Iceland. In April 1941, during the evacuation of Greece, she ran aground off Nafplio, Greece. The following day, she was bombed and became a total loss.

After the war, she was replaced on the Liverpool - Belfast service by the British and Irish ferry MV Leinster (renamed Ulster Prince (2)).

== Service ==
- Liverpool - Belfast (1930 - 1940)
- wartime troop ship (1940–41)
