= Ardrossan Castle =

Castle in North Ayrshire, Scotland

- Ardrossan, North Ayrshire, Scotland NS233424
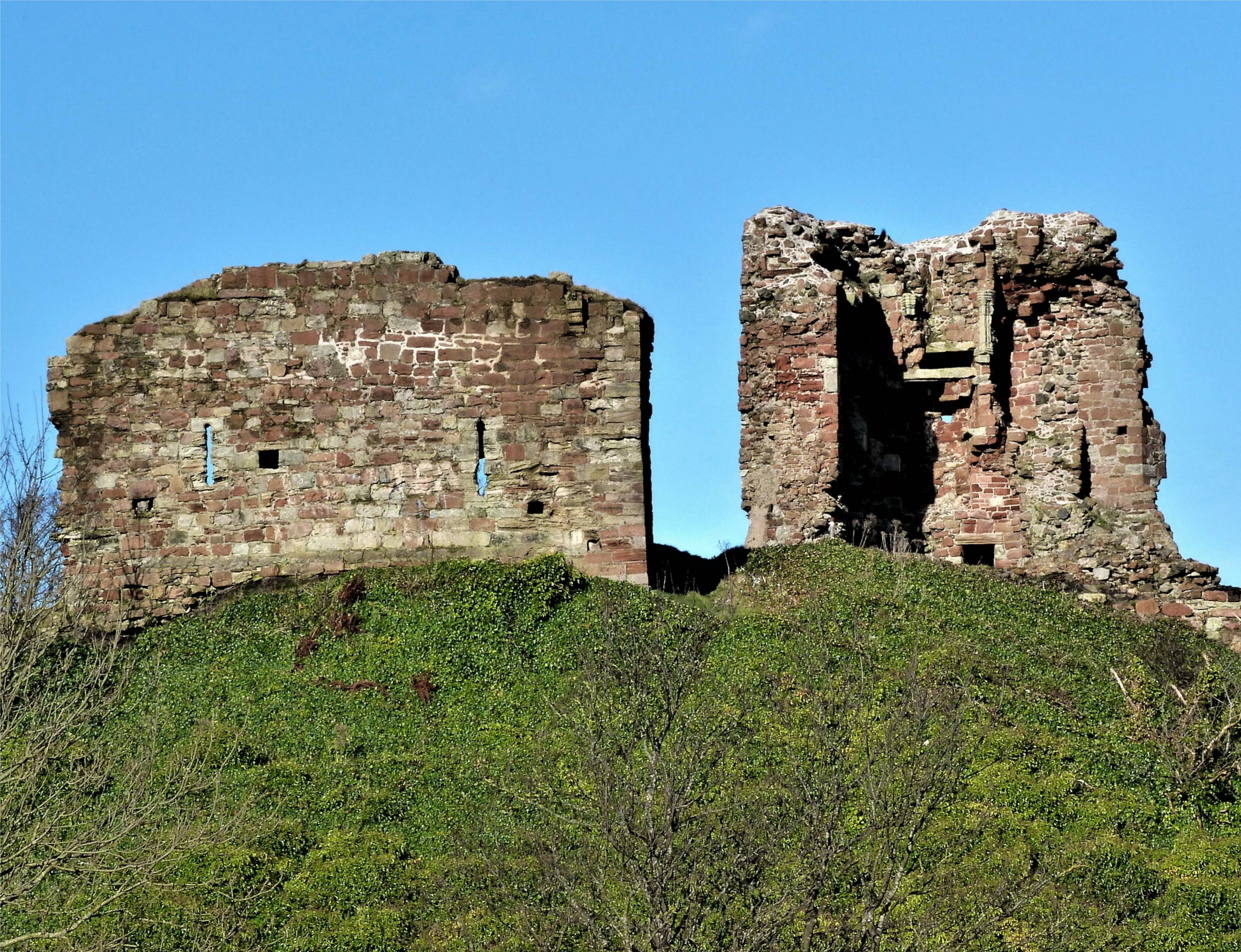
- Ardrossan Castle

Site information
- Type: Castle of enceinte
- Open to the public: No – fenced and under video surveillance (caution advised due to loose rocks)
- Condition: Ruined

Location
- Shown within North Ayrshire
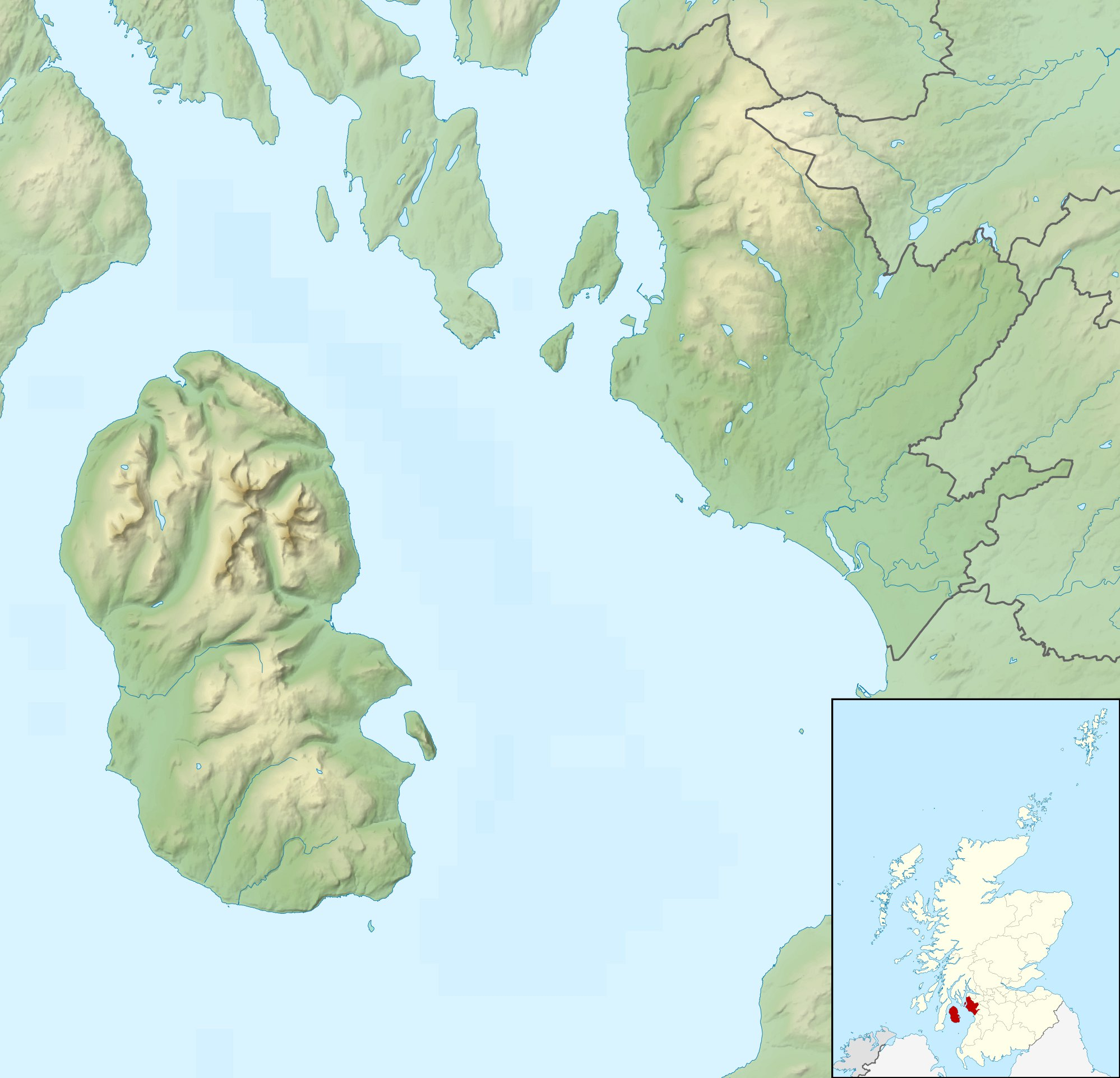
- Location within North Ayrshire
- Coordinates: 55.64°N 4.81°W

Site history
- Built: c.1140
- Built by: Simon de Morville
- In use: No
- Materials: Stone, wood and metal

Ardrossan Castle is a 12th–century castle situated in the town of Ardrossan, North Ayrshire on the west coast of Scotland. The castle, defended by a moat, stands on a ridge above the town. There is a keep dating from the fifteenth century, and a vaulted range containing a kitchen and cellars. In a deep passageway there is a well, and part of the keep remains up to the corbels of the parapet, but it is in ruins.

The original castle, owned by Clan Barclay, was partly destroyed during the Wars of Scottish Independence. This event, in which the English garrison was slaughtered, became known as "Wallace's Larder," a name which is still applied to the remaining vaults. Rebuilt by Clan Montgomery in the 15th century, Ardrossan later fell into disuse and was partially demolished by the soldiers of Oliver Cromwell in the 17th century who used the stones to help construct the Ayr Citadel. This castle is the subject for a ghostlore story featuring the ghost of William Wallace.

== History ==
Ardrossan Castle is situated upon a rocky hill, which gives it its name, made up of ard, meaning height, and rossan, a rocky promontory. The castle is believed to have been constructed in four phases, the original construction being in the 12th century. During the second phase of construction, the gatehouse was completely reconstructed from the first floor, assuming to repair damage to the castle during the First War of Scottish Independence. It is estimated that the third phase of construction occurred sometime in the 15th or the early 16th century, which included the gatehouse being transformed into a heightened keep and some indications that work to the castle at this time may have included the erection of a chapel. The entrance to the castle from the keep was blocked during the fourth phase of construction, together with a wide-mounted gun port being added to the castle design. The present ruins are on the site of an earlier castle owned by the Barclay family. By the thirteenth century it had passed to the Ardrossan family.

The Privy Council of Scotland met at Ardrossan Castle on 18 June 1546, a break from their traditional meeting places typically in Edinburgh, Stirling or St Andrews. The castle has long been deemed a distinctive feature of the town of Ardrossan. It was included, for example, in the tour book from 1847 titled Sylvan's Pictorial Handbook to the Clyde and its Watering-Places by Thomas and Edward Gilks. There the castle is described as a marker of regional identity and subject antiquarian interest, from which beautiful views of the ocean can be seen. The Gilks state that Ardrossan was originally called "Castle Crags", but was renamed Ardrossan after the family who owned it. At the time of writing the castle was the property of the Eglintoun family, though it was already ruined, and was adjacent to an old churchyard.

=== Destruction ===
The Earls of Eglington kept the castle, and the accounts for 1617 include "seventeen feet of rigging-stone" worked by a stonemason for repairs. In 1648 Oliver Cromwell's troops destroyed the castle, removing much of the stone and taking it to Ayr to build a fort, called the Ayr Citadel, there. The ruins of this castle still stand, but are in hazardous condition. The building has been designated a Scheduled monument.

== Legends ==
The castle is said to be haunted by the ghost of William Wallace, who is said to wander the ruins on stormy nights.

The castle is also associated with the Devil. Sir Fergus Barclay, also known as "the De'il of Ardrossan", was a horseman, famous around the lands for his tremendous skill. The secret to his skill, however, was a magical bridle, which was given to Barclay by the Devil, in exchange for his soul. However, the Devil was tricked by Barclay into giving his soul back. Infuriated by this trickery, the Devil attacked the castle in his rage, and is said to have left his hoof prints on one of the rocks. Sir Fergus Barclay is buried in the castle chapel, situated a few hundred yards inland from the castle, further down the hill.

== See also ==
- Montgomerieston - the Burgh of Regality at Ayr within the old Ayr Citadel partly built from Ardrossan Castle's stones.
- Scheduled monuments in North Ayrshire

== Bibliography ==
- Coventry, Martin. The Castles of Scotland, Goblinshead, 2001
- Guthrie. History of Ardrossan, Guthrie Press
- Gilks, Thomas and Edward. Sylvan's Pictorial Handbook to the Clyde and its Watering-Places 1847
