= Ulster Prince =

Ulster Prince or prince of Ulster, may refer to:

- "Prince of Ulster", an aristocratic title held by The O'Neill, see King of Ulster
- MV Ulster Prince, several ships

== See also ==
- Earl of Ulster
- Ulster (disambiguation)
