= Ardrossan =

Coordinates: 55.6432°N 04.8097°W

Ardrossan: Scottish Gaelic: Àird Rosain; Scots: Ardrussan
- Town, sea port and former burgh
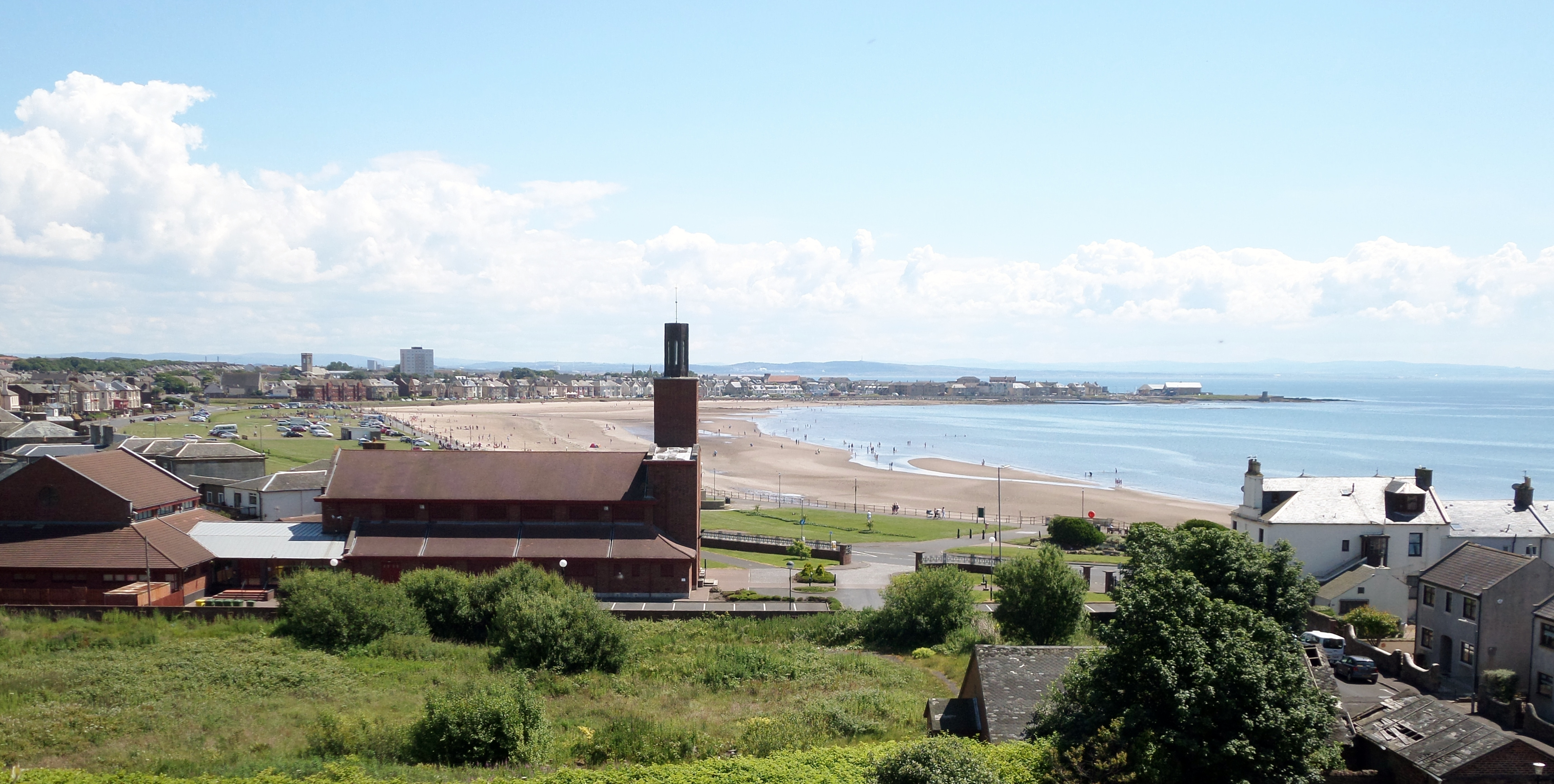
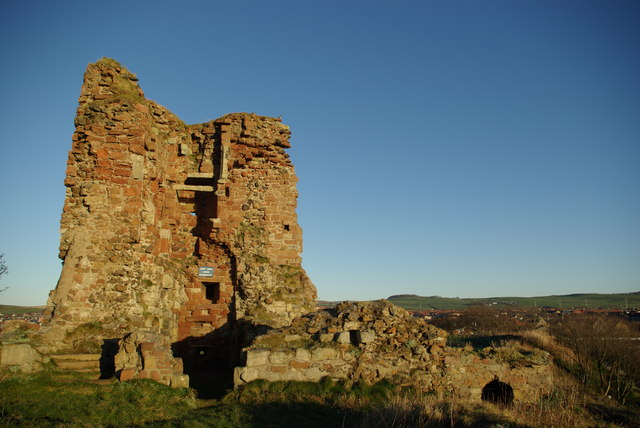
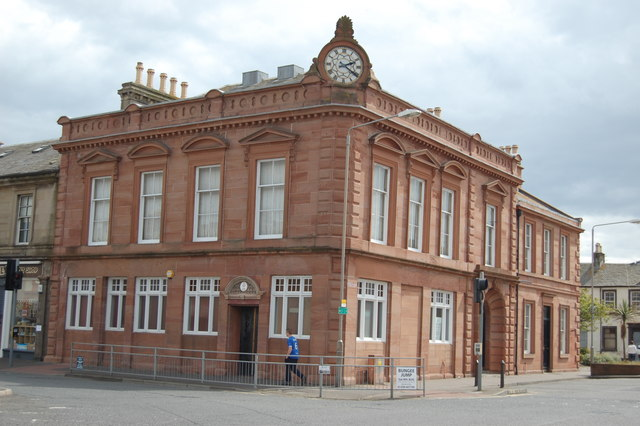
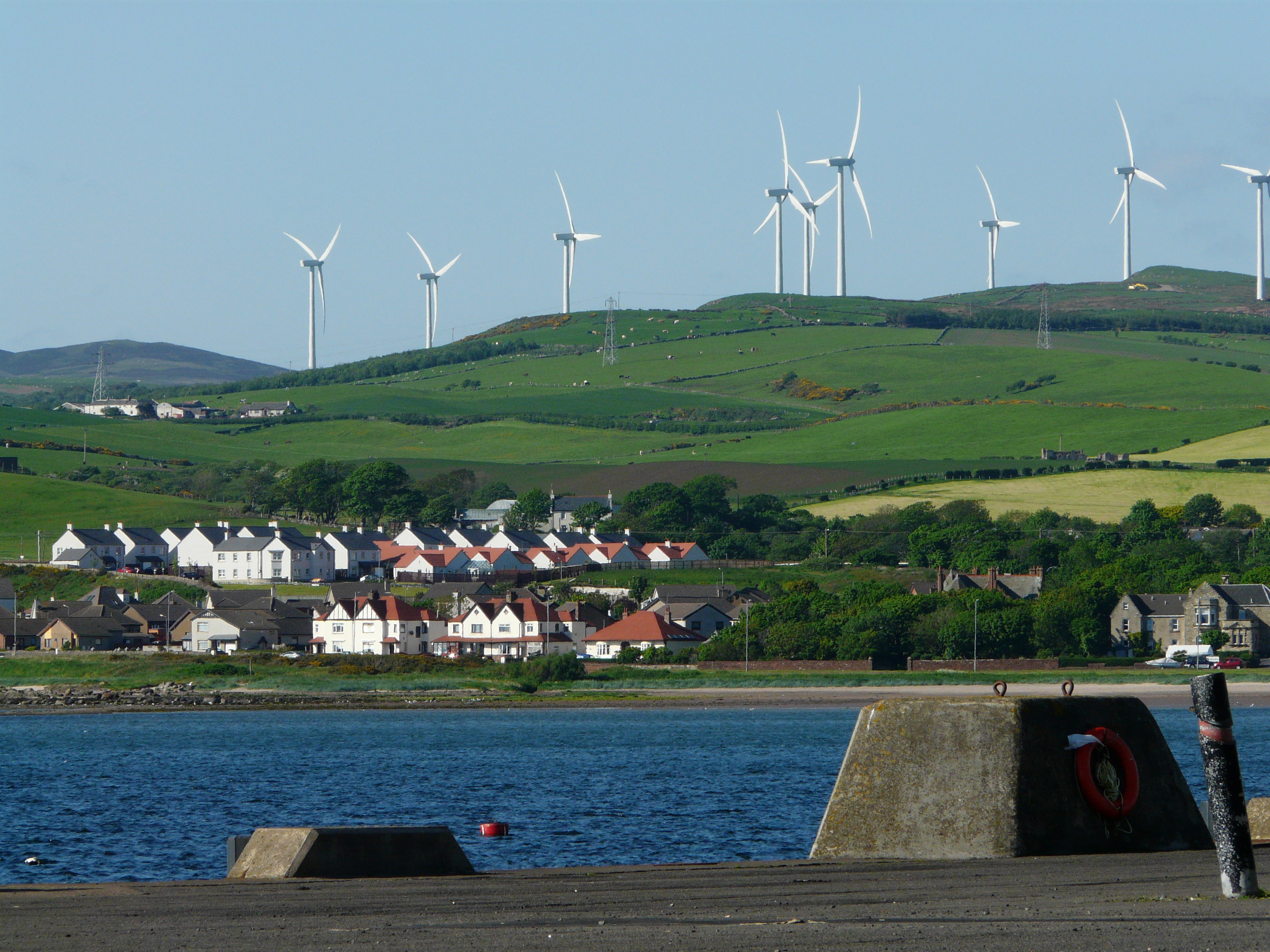
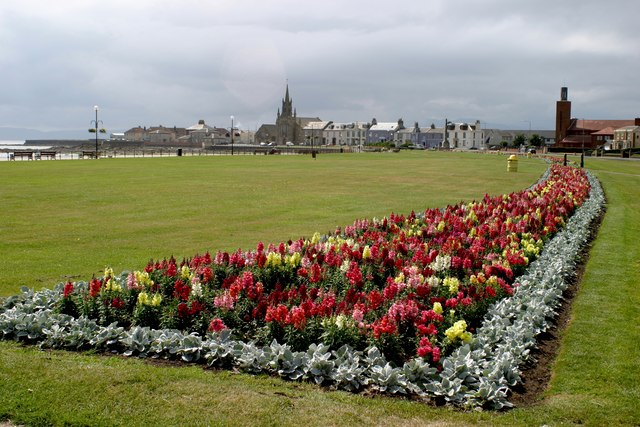
- Ardrossan South Beach from Cannon Hill Ardrossan Castle Town Hall Building Ardrossan Wind Farm South Beach Promenade

- Location within North Ayrshire
- Population: 10,500 (2020)
- OS grid reference: NS232424
  - Edinburgh: 79.1 miles (127.3 km)
  - London: 432.3 miles (695.7 km)
- Council area: North Ayrshire
- Lieutenancy area: Ayrshire and Arran
- Country: Scotland
- Sovereign state: United Kingdom
- Post town: ARDROSSAN
- Postcode district: KA22
- Dialling code: 01294
- Police: Scotland
- Fire: Scottish
- Ambulance: Scottish
- UK Parliament: North Ayrshire and Arran
- Scottish Parliament: Cunninghame North

Ardrossan (/ɑːrˈdrɒsən/; from Scottish Gaelic Àird Rosain 'headland of the small promontory') is a town on the North Ayrshire coast in southwestern Scotland. The town has a population of 10,670 and forms part of a conurbation with Saltcoats and Stevenston known as the 'Three Towns'. Ardrossan is located on the east shore of the Firth of Clyde, and is the main terminal of Caledonian MacBrayne ferry services operating from mainland Scotland to the Isle of Arran.

The town is home to the Ardrossan Wind Farm, and is home to a number of businesses and organisations including Cunningham Housing Association. The town is served by two secondary schools – Ardrossan Academy and St Matthews Academy. A new 2–18 curriculum campus is currently under construction, and will include Ardrossan Academy and Winton Primary School & Early Years on the former Shell oil refinery site.

== History ==
=== Origins ===
Ardrossan's roots can be traced to the construction of its castle 'Cannon Hill', thought to be in around 1140, by Simon de Morville. The castle and estate passed to the Barclay family (also known as Craig) and through successive heirs until the 14th century when it passed to the Eglinton family on the death of Godfrey Barclay de Ardrossan, who died without an heir. Sir Fergus Barclay, Baron of Ardrossan, was said to be in league with the Devil and in one of his dealings, set the task for the Devil to make ropes from sand; on failing to do so, the Devil kicked the castle with his hoof in frustration and left a petrosomatoglyph hoofprint. The castle stood until 1648, when Oliver Cromwell's troops had it destroyed, taking much of the stonework to Ayr to build the citadel at Montgomerieston. The ruins of Cromwell's Fort still stand, but are overgrown and in a dangerous condition.

In 1759, The 10th Earl of Eglinton formed a herd of the ancient breed of White or Chillingham cattle at Ardrossan, probably using stock from the Cadzow herd. The numbers dropped and in 1820 the remaining animals were dispersed. All the animals in the herd were hornless.

=== Development and significance ===
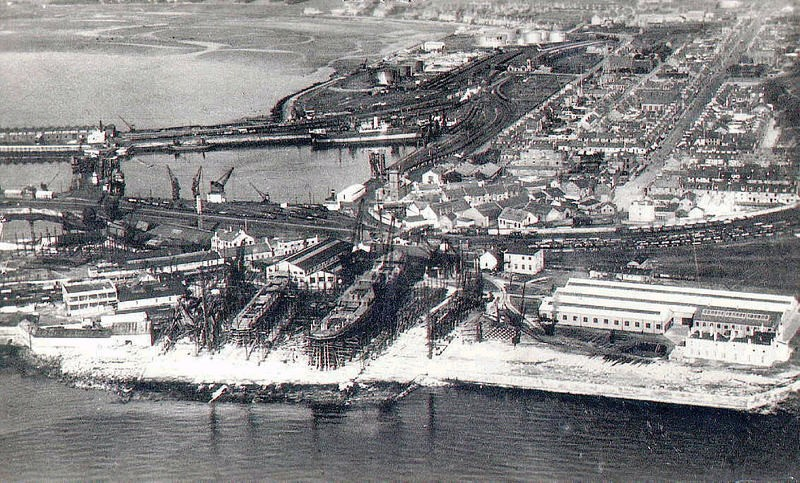
Ardrossan from the air c. 1920

Ardrossan developed during the 18th and 19th centuries thanks to its position on the coast. Exports of coal and pig iron to Europe and North America were the main trade from the town's port, which became a centre for shipbuilding. Fishing vessels and small cargo boats were the mainstay of the shipyard until the 1950s, when the yard ceased to exist as a result of foreign competition. A smaller yard, McCrindle's, operated until the 1980s before it ceased trading.

Passenger services from Ardrossan Harbour to Brodick on the Isle of Arran started in 1834, and services to Belfast, in Ulster in the north of Ireland, and to the Isle of Man followed in 1863 and 1892 respectively. Clyde sailings were operated initially by the Glasgow and South Western Railway Company from Winton Pier and the Caledonian Railway from Montgomerie Pier. The Earl of Eglinton's ambitious plan for a canal link to Glasgow was never realised.

Between 1841 and 1848, Ardrossan was a part of the "West Coast Main Line" equivalent of its time. The fastest route from London to Glasgow was by train to Fleetwood, and then by packet boat to Ardrossan. After 1848 the entire journey could be made by rail, avoiding Ardrossan. The link to the Isle of Man no longer operates, having first been moved to Stranraer until all Scottish services terminated. Shell-Mex operated an [oil refinery] on behalf of the Air Ministry, from a Second World War aviation-fuel canning factory, and the harbour was expanded for the company's tanker ships to berth.

The harbour has been redeveloped as a marina, and the passenger and vehicle ferry to Brodick is operated by Caledonian MacBrayne.

=== Burgh status ===
Ardrossan became a burgh, in 1846, with a provost, magistrates and commissioners. After the Second World War, the burgh was based at Ardrossan Civic Centre. Its burgh status was lost in 1974 on the formation of Strathclyde Regional Council, when it came under Cunninghame District. It is now part of North Ayrshire, created as a unitary authority in 1996.

In 1921 Ardossan was the European site for the first successful reception of medium wave radio signals from North America. Using a wavelength of about 230 to 235 metres (a frequency near 1.3 Megahertz) an amateur radio group in Connecticut sent Morse code signals to a station set up in a tent.

== Infrastructure ==
=== Railway ===
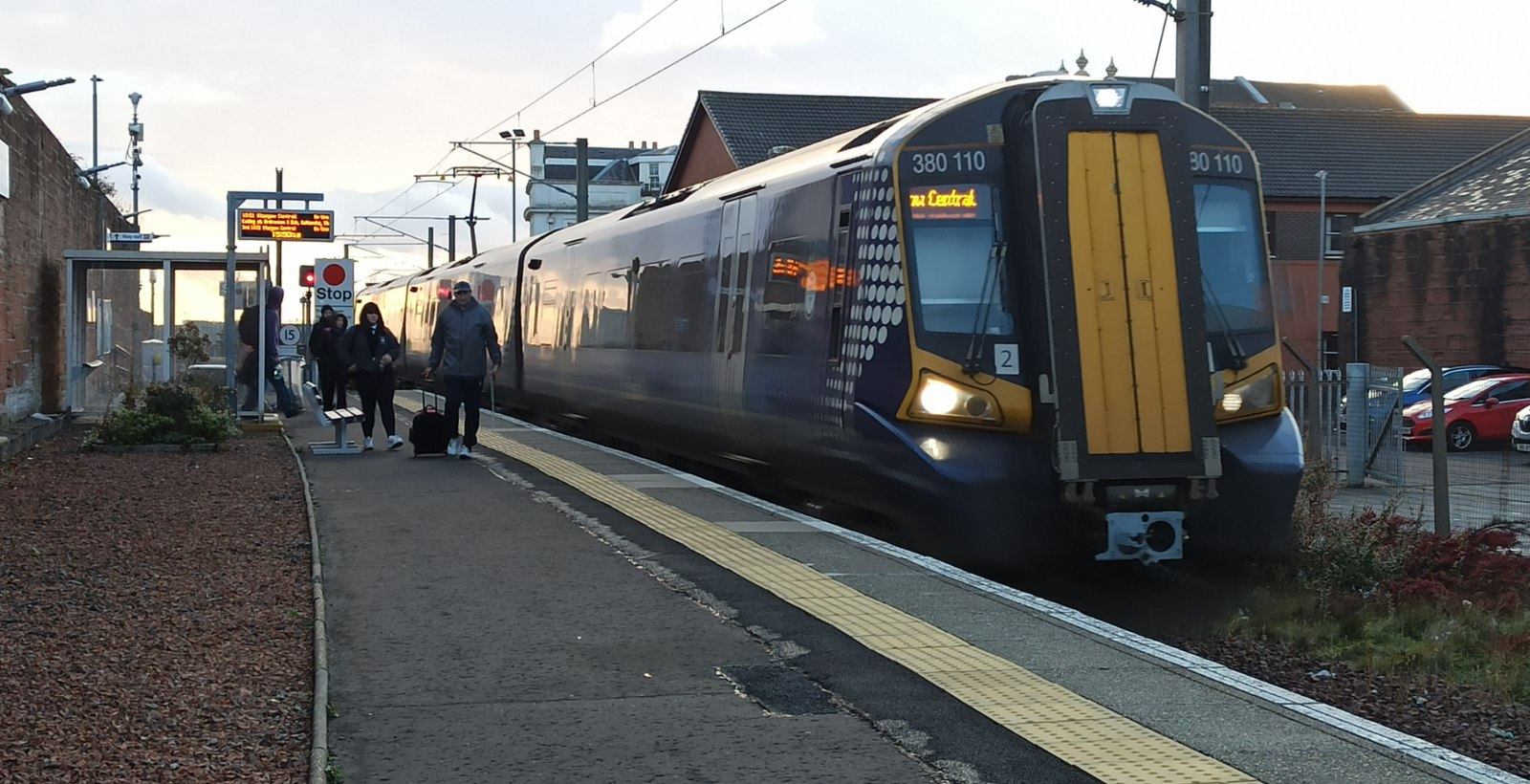
Ardrossan Town railway station

The town has three railway stations: Ardrossan South Beach, close to the boundary with Saltcoats; Ardrossan Town, closed 1968 and reopened 1987; and Ardrossan Harbour near the port for the Arran ferry. Ardrossan South Beach station is at the junction on the Ayrshire Coast Line, where the lines to Ardrossan Harbour and Largs diverge. There are two trains per hour that head eastbound from Ardrossan South Beach to Glasgow Central, of which one comes from Ardrossan Harbour, calling at Ardrossan Town, and the other comes from Largs. All rail services from Ardrossan are operated by ScotRail.

There are two closed railway stations: Ardrossan North was adjacent to Montgomerie Street, and the platform remains can still be seen, although the redevelopment of the former Shell Bitumen Plant site edges closer to the remains. Ardrossan Montgomerie Pier was further down the line from Ardrossan North, but the building of the harbourside apartments removed the last remains of the platforms and no evidence remains that a railway station once stood there. The last train ran through these stations around 1968, although by that time they served summer boat train services only, after regular passenger traffic ceased in 1932.

=== Roads and bus services ===
Ardrossan is linked to Glasgow via the A737 road and to Ayr via the A78 road. The A78 Three Towns Bypass opened in December 2004 and has provided an improvement to local transport links, reducing local travelling times. The bypass has diverted heavier traffic from the Three Towns. Bus services to the town are operated primarily by Stagecoach South Scotland.

=== Ferry services ===
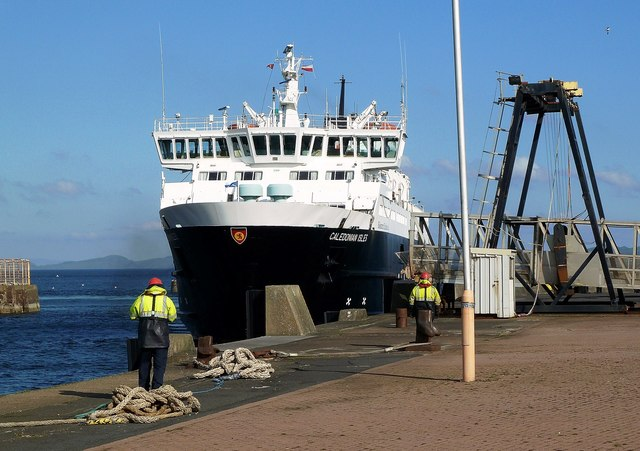
MV Caledonian Isles (known locally as the Arran Ferry) docked at Ardrossan harbour

A regular ferry service from Ardrossan to Brodick on the Isle of Arran has run since 1834. The ferry departs every two hours and 45 minutes Monday–Saturday and takes 55 minutes. A summer-only ferry service to Campbeltown started on 23 May 2013, however it was cancelled for 2020 during the Covid pandemic, and as of 2026 had yet to be reinstated.

In February 2024, concerns were raised about the long-term future of ferry services from Ardrossan to Arran and Campbeltown following the permanent closure by Peel Ports of the Irish Berth at Ardrossan Harbour, which had been used as a secondary berth by Caledonian MacBrayne. The closure was condemned by CalMac chief executive Robbie Drummond and Arran residents. A further issue was that the new vessels ordered for the Arran service, Glen Sannox and MV Glen Rosa, were too large for Ardrossan, and therefore would be required to operate from Troon until upgrade works could be completed. On 18 March 2026, Caledonian Maritime Assets completed the purchase of Ardrossan harbour to allow these works to be undertaken, confirming the long-term future for Ardrossan as the main port for the Arran service. As of May 2026, the upgrade works are due to begin in 2027, with the harbour due to be closed for the duration of the works.

In the past, Ardrossan had ferry services to Belfast and, in summer, to the Isle of Man. The Belfast run was operated by the Burns and Laird Line and its last scheduled service was in 1976. The last ship to sail the route was MV Lion, which was the largest car ferry to operate from Ardrossan. The Isle of Man run was operated by the Isle of Man Steam Packet Company during the summer season, and its last service was in 1985, however Caledonian MacBrayne experimented with a smaller vessel for a couple of seasons, which ran one return service per week.

=== Energy ===
Ardrossan is located near two nuclear power stations: Hunterston A, 360 MW and Hunterston B, 1215 MW. Both power stations have been shut down and are in a process of decommissioning. Hunterston A was shut down officially in 1990, whilst Hunterston B was shut down in 2022 and formally began decommissioning in 2026. Ardrossan Wind Farm, a 24 MW wind farm that opened in 2004, overlooks the town.

== Governance ==
Ardrossan is in the Ayrshire North and Arran constituency in the House of Commons and Cunninghame North constituency in the Scottish Parliament. The Westminster seat is held by the Scottish Labour Party following the election of Irene Campbell in 2024, and the Holyrood seat was gained by the Scottish National Party from Labour in the May 2007 election by a mere 48 votes.

Historically, Ardrossan has been part of the UK parliament constituencies North Ayrshire (1868–1918), Bute and Northern Ayrshire (1918–1983) and Cunninghame North (1983–2005). These constituencies historically returned Conservative or Unionist MPs until 1987, when the constituency was won by the Labour Party.

== Education ==
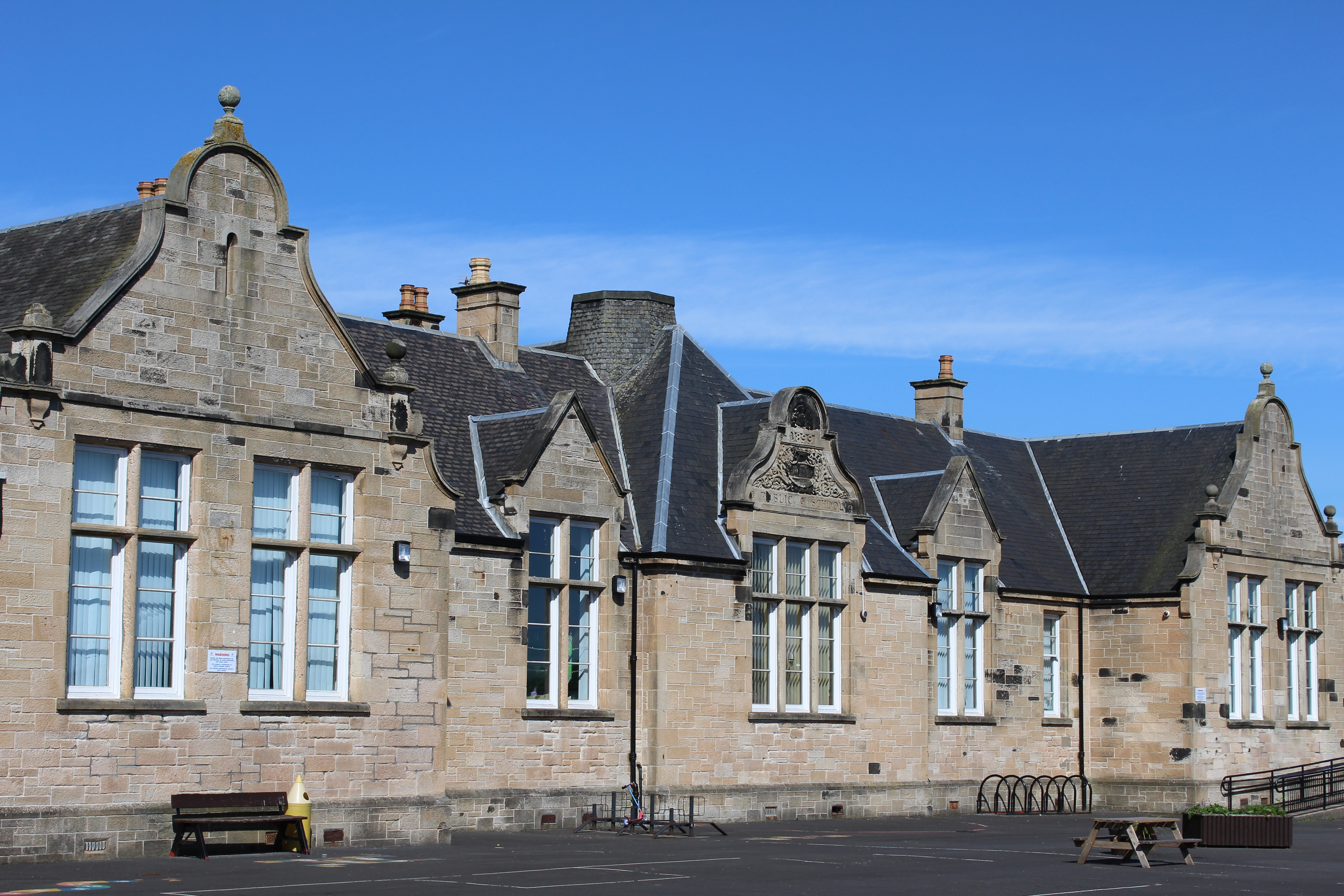
Winton Primary School & EYC, originally constructed in 1899

Ardrossan is served by three primary schools (St Peter's Primary School, Stanley Primary School, and Winton Primary School) and two secondary schools: Ardrossan Academy, a non-denominational school opened in 1882, has about 1,050 students from Ardrossan, Saltcoats, West Kilbride and Seamill; St Matthews Academy in Saltcoats is the secondary school for Roman Catholic pupils from Ardrossan.

In 2020, North Ayrshire Council formally applied to close both Ardrossan Academy and Winton Primary School in the future to merge both establishments into a single educational campus. The Scottish Government formally accepted North Ayrshire Council's proposal in June 2020.

A new 2–18 education campus is projected to be completed by 2027, and will incorporate both Winton Primary School & Early Years Centre and Ardrossan Academy into a single building which will also include community facilities. The project is estimated to be valued at £80 million.

== Culture ==
=== Religion ===
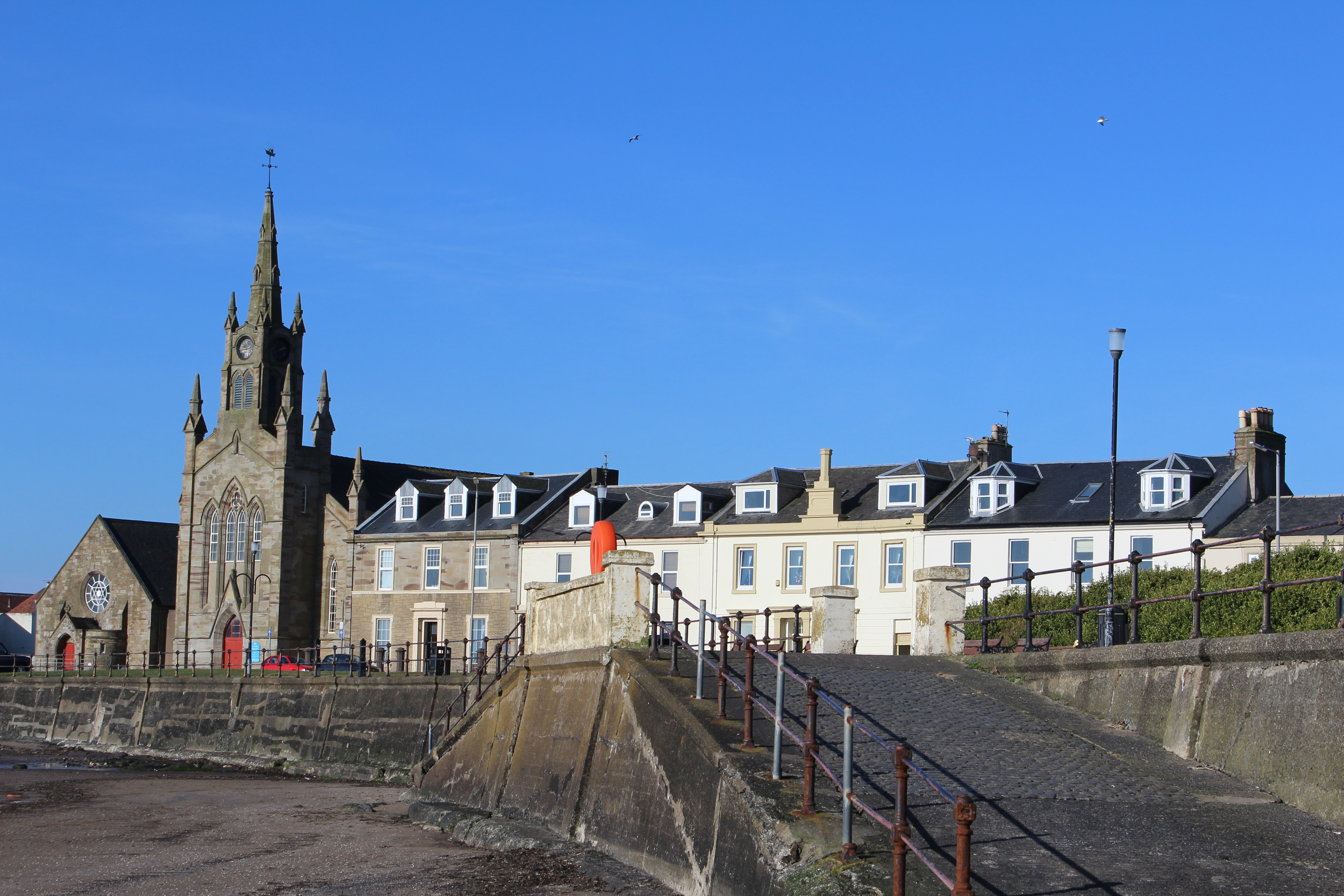
Barony St. John's Church

In Ardrossan, there are five churches. St.Peter-in-Chains is a Roman Catholic church and was designed by Jack Coia and opened in 1938. It is a Category A Listed building, with the Stations of the Cross are by Archibald Dawson. Park Church is a meeting place of the Church of Scotland, whilst there is also an EU Congregational Church, Church of the Nazarene and a St Andrew's Scottish Episcopal Church located within the town.

=== Amenities ===
- Eglinton Country Park is linked to Ardrossan by the Sustrans Cyclepath.
- The town has two diplomatic missions, a Danish and a Norwegian consulate.
- The town has a municipal cemetery, on Sorbie Road, which was opened in 1854. It contains the graves of 23 sailors who died in the sinking of HMS Dasher.

=== Sport ===
Ardrossan is home to a number of sports teams including Ardrossan Winton Rovers, an association football club which plays in the West of Scotland League, and North Ayrshire Table Tennis Club.

=== Castlehill ===
Castlehill is also known as 'Cannon Hill' by locals. A historic ancient burial place on Castle Hill was vandalized in the 1950s. One tomb was then taken to the Barony Church on South Crescent for safekeeping.

A prehistoric shell-mound, measuring 102 ft by 16 ft, on the side of Cannon Hill, close to Ardrossan Town railway station, was excavated by the Ayrshire historian John Smith in the 1890s. Its length was mostly overhung by a few feet, by the rock face, which had formed a rock-shelter, which the excavation showed had been occupied at intervals over a considerable period. The railway workings had cut a longitudinal section in the mound, which overlay a 1 ft layer of raised beach sand.

The mound was composed of seashells, mainly periwinkle and limpet, and animal bones. Relics found included a stone 'anchor' with a groove cut round it for a rope, a possible stone sinker, fragments of very coarse, hammer stone, hand-made pottery, also pieces of wheel-turned, glazed pottery, a bone chisel, two bone needles, etc. No sign of the mound is visible today.

== Notable people ==
- Roy Aitken, footballer, captain of Celtic Football Club in the 1980s and captain of the Scotland national team
- Sam Black, artist
- Flying Officer Kenneth Campbell, recipient of the Victoria Cross
- Dugald Drummond, born in Ardrossan in 1840, was chief mechanical engineer with the Caledonian Railway
- Peter Drummond, was a senior executive for the Glasgow and South Western Railway
- Peter Duncan, former Shadow Secretary of State for Scotland
- Bobby Ferguson, goalkeeper for Kilmarnock in the 1960s.
- Billy Gilmour, professional footballer, currently playing for Napoli and the Scotland national football team
- Janet Hendry, first female pilot in Scotland
- Elizabeth Innes (1921 - 2015), paediatric haematologist
- Paul Ireland, film director
- Calum Kennedy (1928–2006), popular exponent of Scottish Gaelic song in the 1950s and 60s
- Robert Lang Mitchell (1928-1996), in the original group of people who formed the Scottish National Party
- John Kerr, physicist who discovered the now-eponymous Kerr effect.
- Campbell Martin, journalist and former Independent Member of the Scottish Parliament for West of Scotland
- Mark Menzies, Conservative member of parliament for Fylde
- Craig Reid, footballer
- W.B. Young, Scottish rugby player
- Andy Boulton, Professional Darts Player, born 1973

== Other places with the same name ==
The name Ardrossan has also been given to places elsewhere in the world:

- Ardrossan, South Australia
- Ardrossan, Alberta
- Ardross, Western Australia
- Ardrossan is the name of a large estate outside Philadelphia, owned by Robert Leaming Montgomery. His daughter, Helen Hope Montgomery Scott, was the inspiration for Tracy Lord, heroine of The Philadelphia Story.

== See also ==
- Industry and the Eglinton Castle estate
- Montfode Castle
