= MV Lion =

Passenger ferry

History
- Name: 1967–1985: Lion; 1985–2002: Baroness M; 1986: Portelet; 2002: Adinda Lestari 101
- Owner: P&O Ferries Ltd (1975–1985); Burns & Laird (1967–1975)
- Operator: 1978–1985: P&O Ferries; 1985: Townsend Thoresen; 1985–1997: Thenamaris Shipping; 1997–2004: Equester Shipping
- Port of registry: Glasgow
- Route: Ardrossan-Belfast (1968–1976)
- Builder: Cammell Laird
- Yard number: 1326
- Launched: 8 August 1967
- Completed: 23 May 1967
- In service: 3 January 1968
- Out of service: 12 February 1976
- Identification: IMO number: 6723654
- Fate: Scrapped 2004

General characteristics
- Tonnage: 3,333 GT
- Length: 110.1 m (361.2 ft)
- Beam: 17.1 m (56.1 ft)
- Draught: 4.3 m (14.1 ft)
- Installed power: 2x 12-cylinder Crossley diesel; 7722 kW.
- Speed: 19 knots (35 km/h; 22 mph)
- Capacity: 1,200 passengers; 170 cars; 40 commercials

MV Lion was a passenger ferry operated by P&O Ferries across the Irish Sea between 1968 and 1976, and across the English Channel until 1986.

== History ==
Three new car ferries were delivered to Coast Lines in 1966/67 to update the Irish Sea services. The third of these, Lion took over the Ardrossan–Belfast day service of Burns & Laird. She entered service on 3 January 1968. Two weeks later, she was damaged in a storm and was out of service for two weeks.

In 1971, Coast Lines were taken over by P&O. The service transferred to Larne in 1975 and ended in 1976 when Lion transferred to Southern Ferries Ltd and left for Le Havre.

Lion was sold to European Ferries (Townsend Thoresen) in 1985, and then to Thenamaris Shipping for service in the Mediterranean. In 1987 and 1988, she was renamed Portelet for charters to British Channel Island Ferries; between charters, she was laid up in Weymouth.

On 24 February 1990, between Larneca and Greece, she came under fire from a gun-boat and was withdrawn for repairs. In 1997, she was sold to Equester Shipping, Kingstown, Saint Vincent and the Grenadines, and left for service in Indonesia.

In March 2004, she was sold for scrapping, arriving at Chittagong Roads, Bangladesh for breaking.

== Layout ==
She was rebuilt in 1976 (with a bow visor) and in 1985.

== Service ==
- 1967–1975: Ardrossan–Belfast
- 1975–1976: Larne–Belfast
- 1976–: Dover–Boulogne
- 1984: Southampton–Le Havre
- 1985: Portsmouth–Le Havre
- 1986: Ancona–Igoumenitsa–Patras–Piraeus–İzmir
- 1987: Weymouth–Jersey–Guernsey
- 1988: Larnaca–Jounieh, Lebanon
- 1990: Piraeus–Larnaca
- 1991: Brindisi–Corfu–Igoumenitsa–Patras
