= Montgomerieston =

Village in South Ayrshire, Scotland

Coordinates: 55°27′51.1″N 4°38′13.0″W

Montgomerieston, sometimes known as Montgomeryston (NGR NS 333 220) or Ayr Fort, was a small burgh of regality and barony of only 16 acres or 6.5 hectares located within the walls of the old Ayr Citadel, also known as Cromwell's Fort or Oliver's Fort, situated in the town of Ayr, South Ayrshire, Scotland. Montgomerieston was named for the Montgomerie family, Earls of Eglinton.

Montgomerieston, Ayr, South Ayrshire.

== History ==
=== The Earls of Eglinton ===
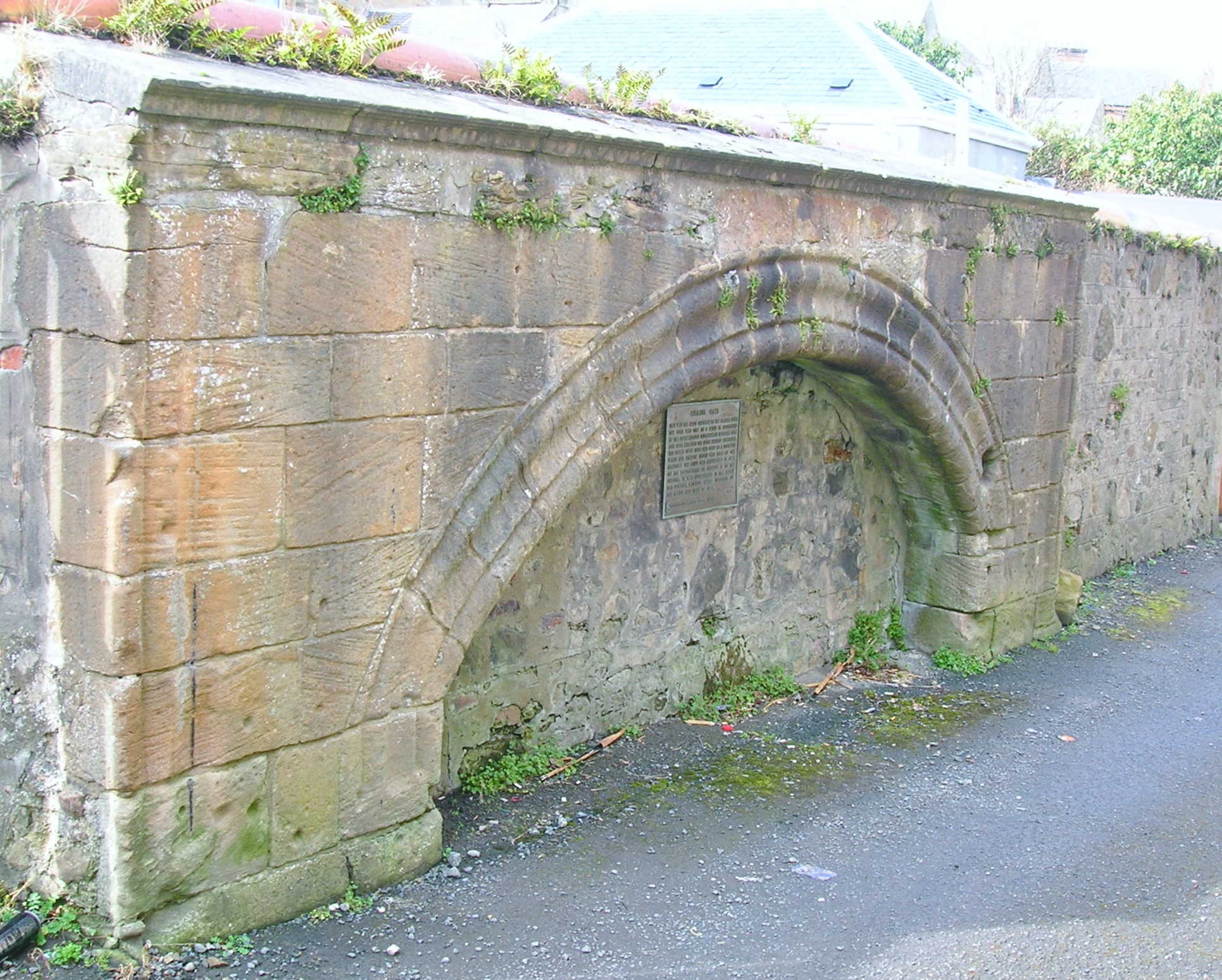
The remains of the old Citadel Gate.

Under Oliver Cromwell five citadels were built in Scotland to control the Scots, such as at Leith, Perth, Inverlochy, Ayr and Inverness, with Ayr being the largest. The Ayr Citadel, built 1652–1653, was designed by the Dutch architect named Hans Ewald Tessin; it was constructed to a hexagonal plan with six bastions. Construction was far from easy with the sand substrate collapsing into pits and water flooding the workings. It had a moat filled with freshwater around it, 90 ft across at the curtain walls and 50 ft across at the bastions. The fort contained two or three 'bomb proof' magazines, one of which is said to have served as a gate.

After 1660 the citadel had been partly dismantled to prevent its use by persons hostile to King Charles II, although the moat was not infilled until around 1800. Wells were dug to provide an independent water supply for the soldiers. The seaward side of the fortifications were kept, possibly for use as a battery should the need arise.

After the restoration of the monarchy under King Charles II these citadels were erected as burghs. As recompense for the losses incurred by the Earl of Eglinton through his support of King Charles I the citadel at Ayr, as a burgh of regality and barony was given to the 7th Earl, Hugh who christened it 'Montgomerieston' after his family's name.

An additional reason for the gift to the Montgomerie family was that as Barons of Ardrossan much of their castle at Ardrossan had been dismantled and shipped to Ayr to supply stone to build the citadel in the first place. The stone is of a similar type to that of Ardrossan Castle and the speed at which the citadel was constructed suggests that a ready supply of quarried stone was available. The cost of the construction was such that Cromwell is said to have commented Has it been built of Gold? Some of the stones carry mason's marks.

This creation in 1663 of the burgh of 'Montgomeriestoun' as it was originally spelt, had been totally opposed by the magistrates of the town. As a partial payment for a debt the burgh was later passed to the Kennedy family.

A lasting benefit of the construction of the citadel was that it protected the church and the town from the ever present danger of inundation by blown sand.

=== Baron Muir ===
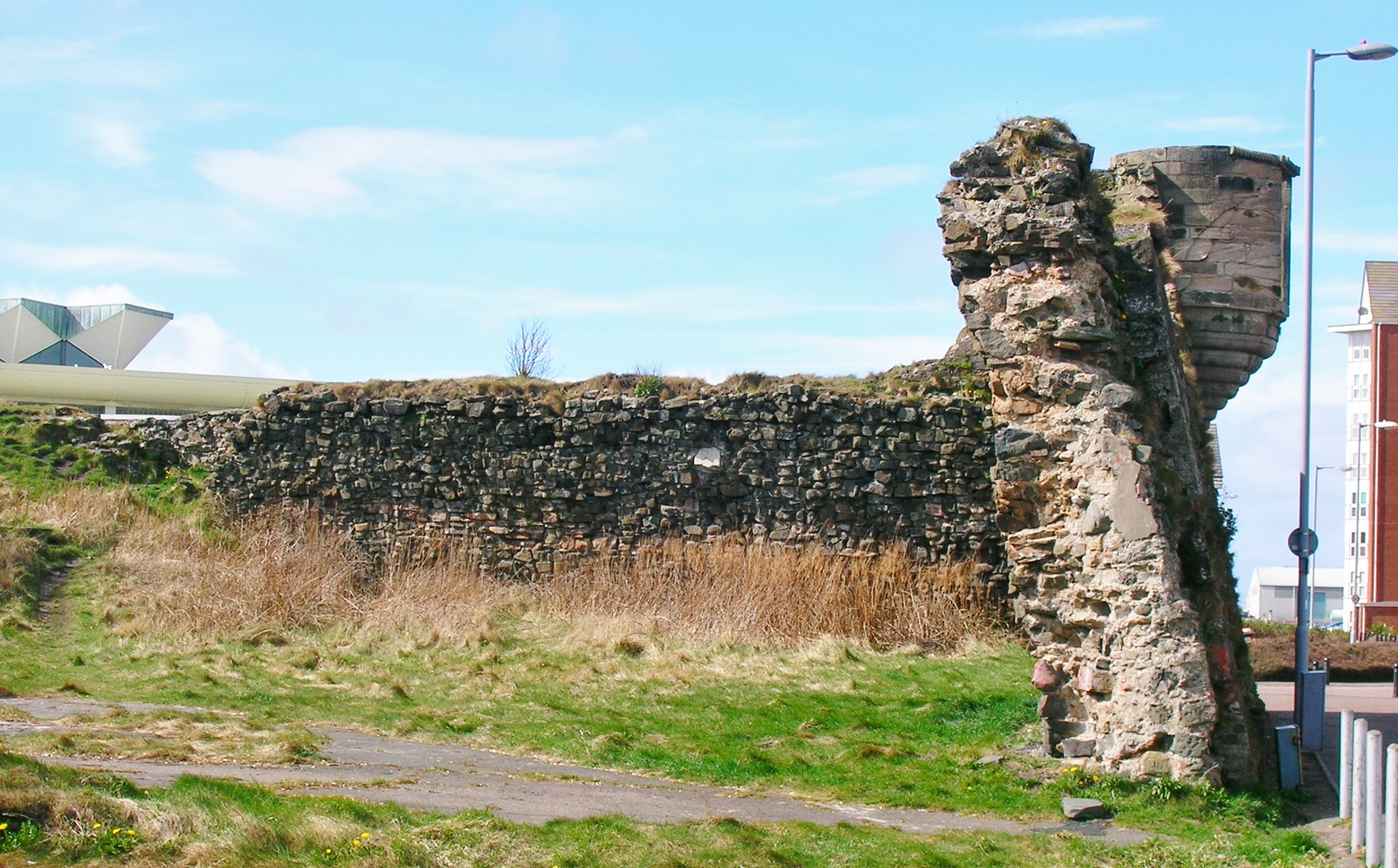
One of the six bastions and Miller's Folly.

The Provost of Ayr, John Muir, and others, purchased the Barony of Montgomerieston from Lord Alexander Montgomerie in 1687, together with its 'liberties and pertinents'.

== Baroness Susanna Montgomerie ==
In 1727 the barony was purchased for Susanna Montgomery, Countess of Eglinton by Captain Nugent. Some privileges were retained by the provost for in 1747 objections were made to the countess having restricted access across the old moat, thereby preventing the people of Ayr from walking where they wished.

=== The Kennedy barons ===
In 1755, Susanna Montgomery, Countess of Eglinton, who was from the Kennedy family of Culzean Castle sold the barony to a relation to whom she owed £700, Sir Thomas Kennedy, later the 9th Earl of Cassillis. The property remained largely unchanged until 1854 when John Miller purchased it.

=== Baron Miller ===
In the 1850s an antiquarian and gunsmith called John Miller returned to Ayrshire from Calcutta where he had made his fortune. Miller purchased the Barony of Montgomerieston and built a Gothic style residence for himself using the tower of St John's church as its centrepiece. He also added an extension to a pre-existing corbelled turret at the end of one of the bastions which is known today as 'Miller's Folly', although the lower courses may be original. A somewhat eccentric character, John Miller styled himself as 'Baron Miller' of Montgomerieston. After having sold off much of the 16 or 17 acres of the 'estate' for residential development, Miller died in 1910 and in 1914 the 3rd Marquess of Bute purchased what was left of the barony and St John's Tower was restored by the 4th Marquess; the 5th Marquess presented it to the Royal Burgh of Ayr in 1949.

== St John the Baptist's church ==
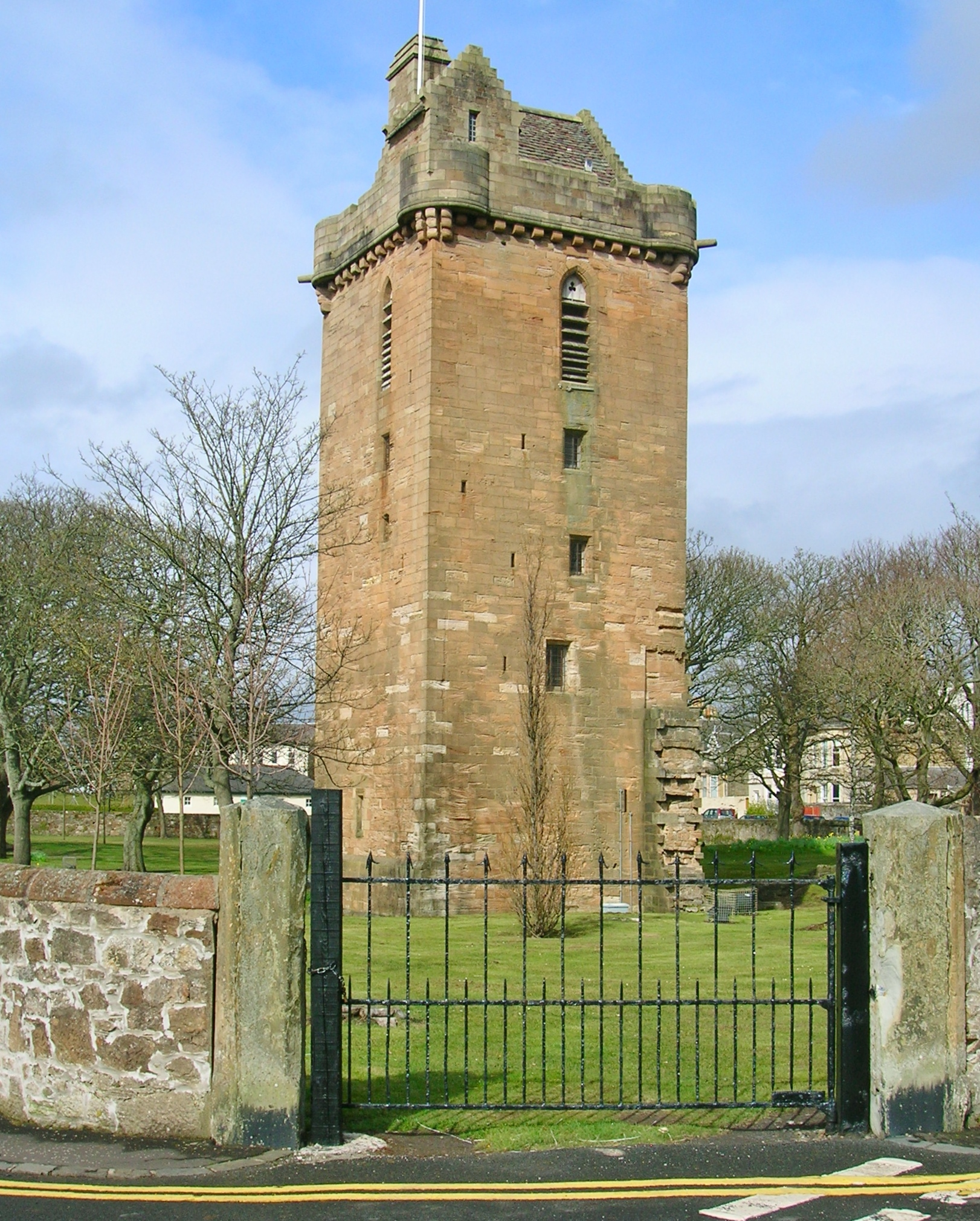
St John's Tower

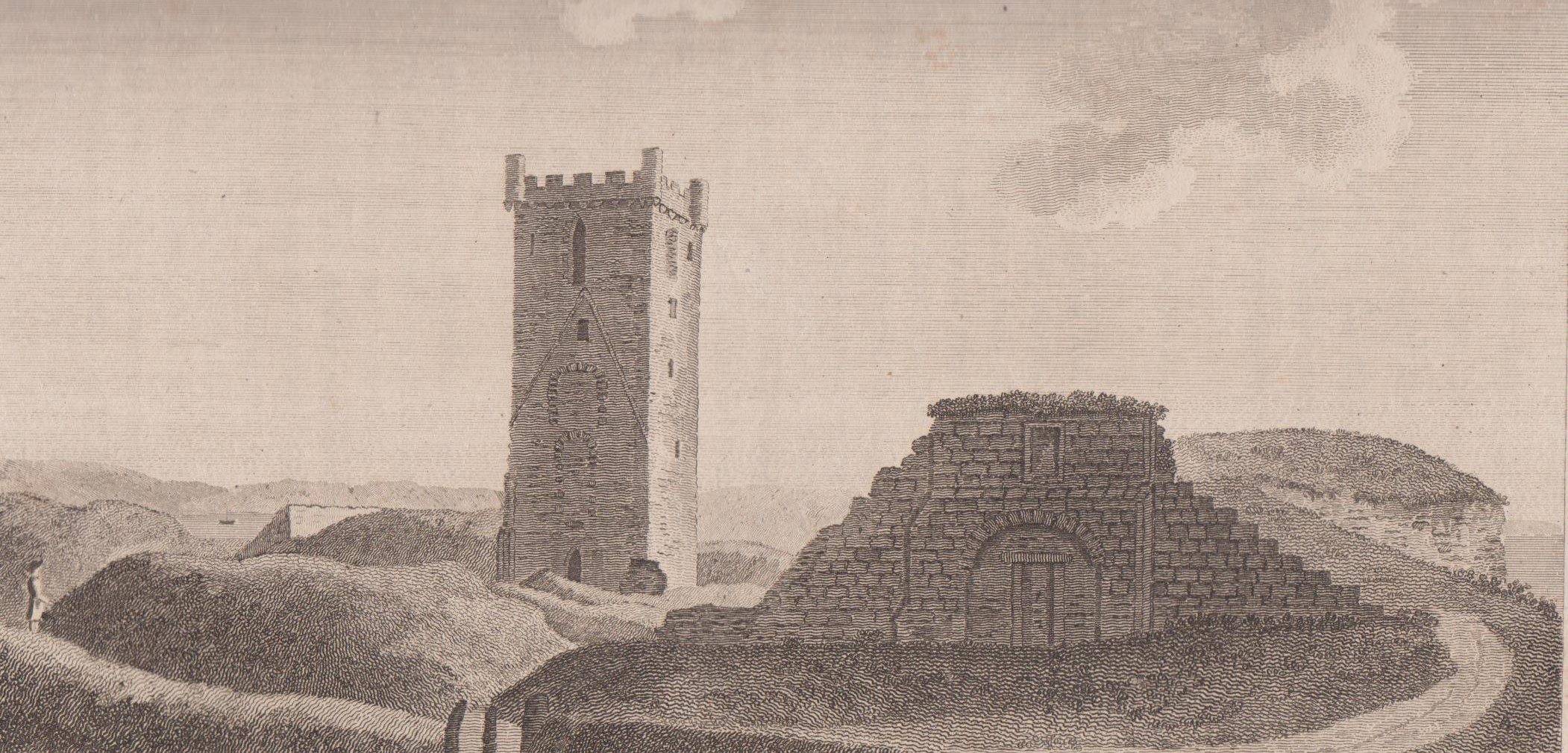
St John's Tower and citadel gate in 1790

First mentioned in 1233 this was the medieval church dedicated to Saint John the Baptist, patron saint of Ayr. Mary, Queen of Scots, came to St John's Tower on 2 August 1563 from Eglinton Castle and travelled to Dunure Castle on 4 August.

The church was used by Cromwell's soldiers as a look-out tower as well as an armoury and chapel, the congregation had been forced out and the Auld Kirk of Ayr came to be built to house them with some financial assistance from Cromwell. The 'Citadel' church was in public use again between 1687 and 1689, after which it ceased to be used for worship and much of it was demolished, the tower itself only being spared as it was a valuable sea-mark for sailors and a look-out for ships.

Burials appear to have continued however judging from Francis Grose's comments in 1789 about new tombstones. Following the sale of the barony to the Countess of Eglinton the town burgesses were very concerned about the condition of the tower and it was repaired with a flat roof added. The old Ayr castle stood nearby the church, within the walls of the citadel.

John Miller built his 'Fort Castle' home around the tower and only in 1913-1914 was it restored to appear much like its original appearance as recorded by John Slezer in his 'Theatrum Scotiae', thanks to the 3rd and 4th Marquess's of Bute's interest in preserving ancient buildings.

A ley tunnel is said to have run from St John's tower to Greenan Castle and in the 1950s reports circulated of the discovery of its entrance with stories of skeletons hanging in chains.

== The Commercial past ==
As a commercial venture pursued by the Earls of Eglinton to rival the Royal Burgh of Ayr itself, the burgh was never a great success. In 1662 the Earl of Eglinton was however given the rights by the Privy Council who in 1662 passed a special act in his favour that gave the earl the right to the manual labour of all the vagrants and temporarily unemployed in Renfrewshire, Ayrshire and Galloway. These individuals were taken to Montgomerieston where he had a wool factory. The heritors from the parishes had to support the labourers to the tune of £6 Scots per month while they were there and the earl only had to provide food and clothing. If the heritors did not pay then the amount was to be taken from their estate funds. These rights lasted for 15 years for the vagrants and five years for the unemployed.

Despite the low costs this business was not a success and it disappears from the records after a relatively short period of time, the buildings being turned into a brewery. In the muniment records of Irvine it is recorded that the council agreed to pay for the maintenance of two 'poor boys' in 1664-1665 who were housed at the manufactory of Ayre alias Montgomeriestoun. The behaviour of the 'enslaved' workers was very poor and in 1665 the earl was urged to control their behaviour by the Archbishop of Glasgow.

=== Montgomerieston brewery ===
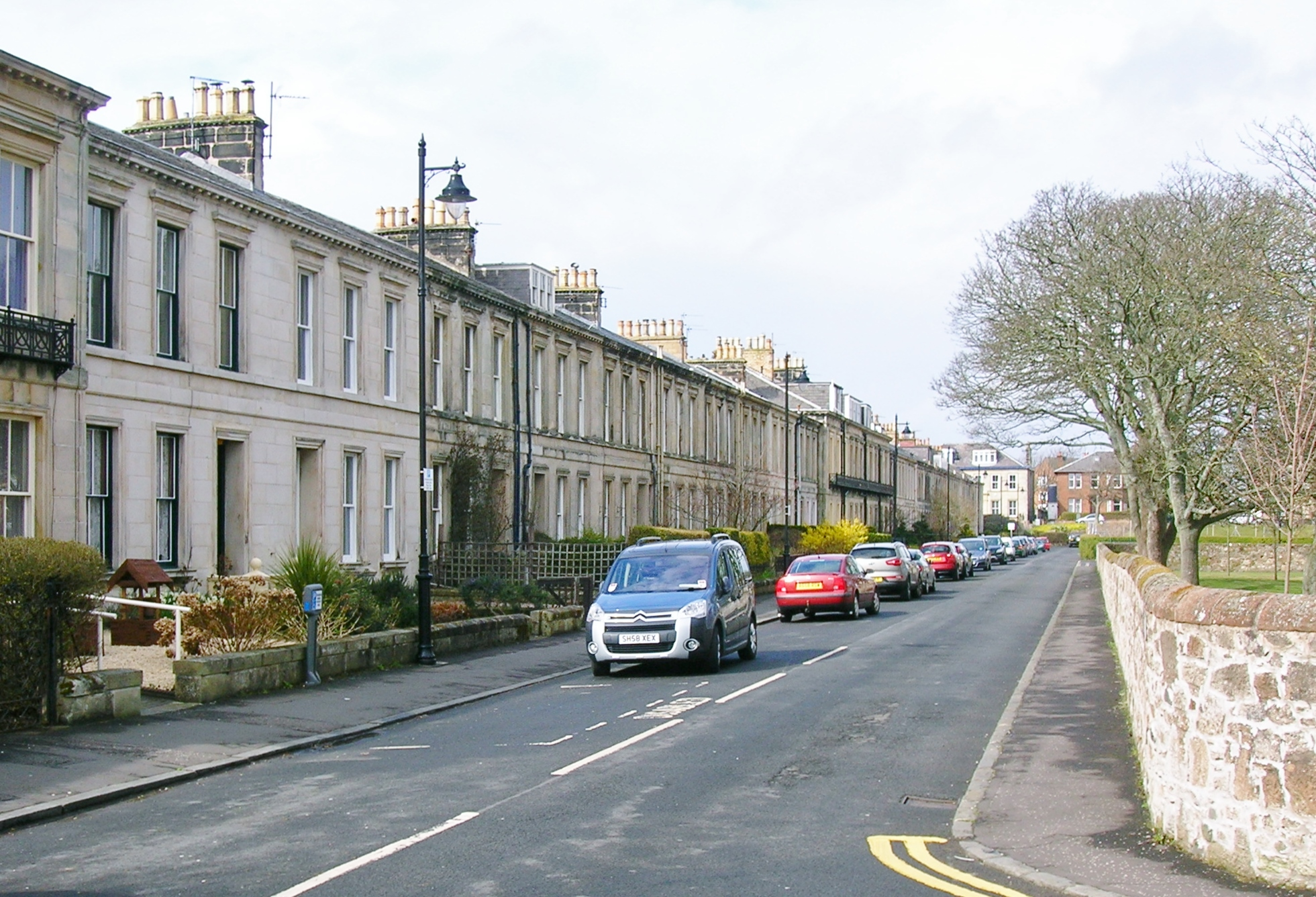
Eglinton Terrace.

Susanna Montgomery, Countess of Eglinton during her period of ownership established a brewery here and it is also recorded that in 1734 whisky was being distilled here and that cinnamon and herbs were being used to produce drinks. In 1754 tenants rented brewery buildings here and in 1787 the Ayr magistrates went to court to obtain payment of 'intown multure' against the brewery operators, McCracken & McConnell, however the right of thirlage was shown at the Court of Session to lie with the Earl and the independence of the Burgh of Montgomerieston was reaffirmed. A kiln and a brewery was located here in the time of the time of Earls of Cassillis and it provided £50 sterling rent per year.

== Residential use ==
In the 1850s Baron Miller laid out Montgomerieston as a residential area. His feu plan, produced by Clarke and Bell survives, however the square outline and circular central area layout was not followed. Street names appropriate to the history of the barony and burgh have been applied, such as Eglinton Terrace and Montgomerie Terrace for the first barons and later Cassillis Street and Ailsa Place for the Kennedy barons. Cromwell himself is remembered at Cromwell Road.

== See also ==
- Ardrossan Castle
- Susanna Montgomery, Countess of Eglinton
- Industry and the Eglinton Castle estate
