= Tyne Tees Steam Shipping Company =

British shipping company

- Industry: Shipping
- Founded: 1903
- Defunct: 1944
- Successor: Coast Lines
- Headquarters: Newcastle upon Tyne
- Area served: Newcastle upon Tyne, London
- Footnotes / references House Flag in 1947

The Tyne Tees Steam Shipping Company was a British shipping company that operated steam-powered maritime services within the United Kingdom from 1903 to 1943. Established in the early 20th century, the company primarily facilitated cargo and passenger transport along the River Tyne, River Tees, and adjacent coastal routes. It played a significant role in regional trade and industrial logistics until its cessation of operations during the Second World War.

== History ==
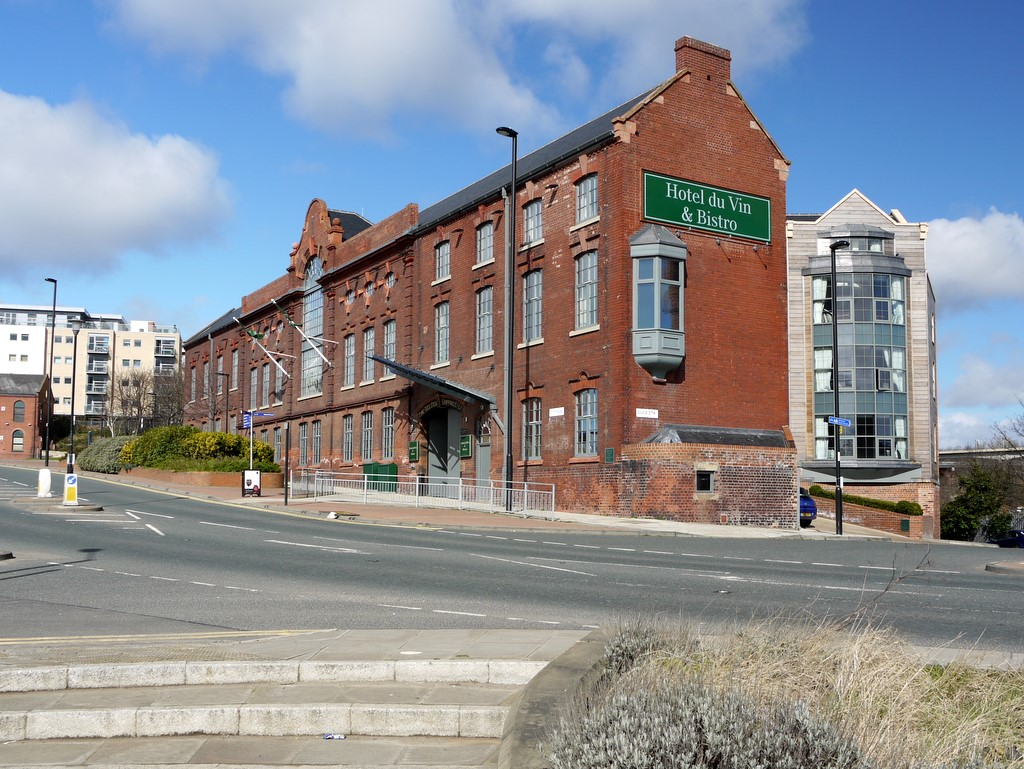
Hotel du Vin, City Road Converted in 2007-8 from the Tyne-Tees Steam Shipping Company offices of 1908 (commonly known as Allan House)

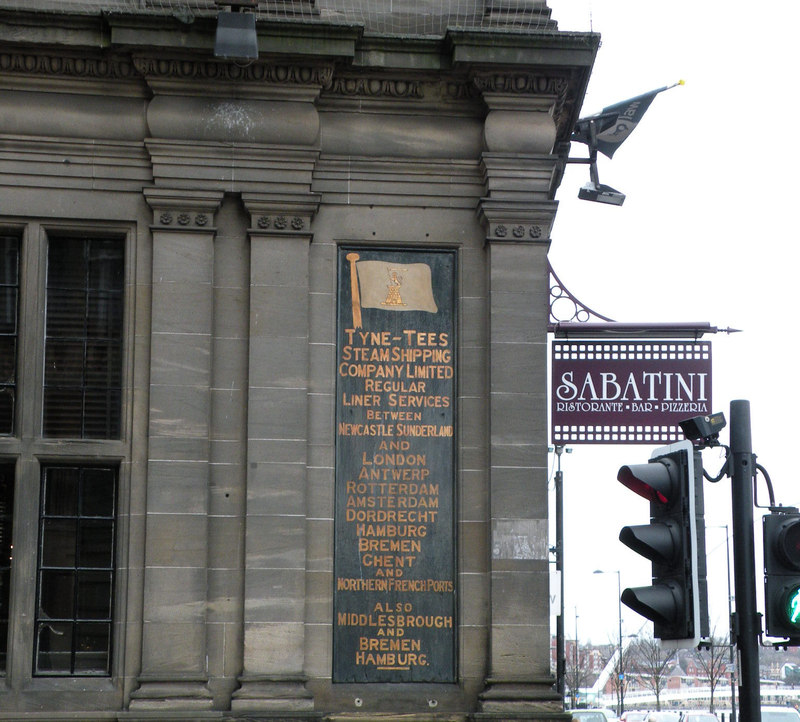
Tyne-Tees Steam Shipping Company sign in King Street, on the side of what is now Sabatini's restaurant

=== Tyne Steam & Tees Union Shipping Companies ===
The Tyne Steam Shipping Company served as the principal maritime operator along the Newcastle coastline during the 19th century. Established in 1864 as a joint-stock company, it consolidated smaller regional operators to provide coordinated steam-powered services.

Separately, the London & Middlesbrough Steamship Company operated the Dione on the Middlesbrough-to-London route. This firm was acquired by the Tees Union Shipping Company in 1880, expanding the latter's regional network and service capacity.

=== Tyne Tees Steam Shipping Company ===
In 1903, the Tyne Steam Shipping Company acquired the Tees Union Shipping Company, and through the subsequent merger with Furness Withy & Co., the Tyne Tees Steam Shipping Company was established. Its founding charter was formalised in October of that year. The company's vessels were distinguished by black funnels featuring a red upper section separated by a white band.

The company operated passenger services linking Teesside, Tyneside, and London, alongside routes to continental Europe. By 1914, it ranked as the seventh-largest coastal shipping firm in the United Kingdom by annual ton-mileage, recording 244,040,472 ton-miles.

Severely affected by the economic downturn of the Great Depression, the company's assets and operations were acquired by Coast Lines Ltd in 1944, marking the end of its independent operations.

== Routes ==
=== Passenger and Cargo Services ===
Newcastle and Sunderland to London, Antwerp, Rotterdam, Amsterdam, Dordrecht, Hamburg, Bremen, Ghent, and northern French ports.

=== Cargo-Only Services ===
Middlesbrough to Bremen and Hamburg.

== Passenger / Cargo ships operated ==
Ship	Launched	Tonnage (GRT)	Notes and references
Diome	1868	849	Built for the Tees Union Shipping Co. and sold in 1908.
Juno	1882	1,311	Built for the Tyne Steam Shipping Co. Detained at Hamburg and abandoned to insurers.
Tynesider	1888	1,378	Built for the Tyne Steam Shipping Co. and sold to the Hellénique de Navigation à Vapeur de Syra, Greece, and renamed Neilos.
Grenadier	1895	1,004	Built by Wigham Richardson and Co. for Tyne Steam Shipping Co. and transferred into the new joint venture and served Rotterdam with occasional voyages to Hamburg and Cuxhaven. Grounded in July 1908 on Frisian coast and was re-floated and repaired in West Hartlepool. Sunk by torpedo on 23 February 1917 with the loss of 8 crew members, including the Master.
Sir William Stephenson	1906	1,540	Built by Palmers Shipbuilding and Iron Company at Yarrow. Employed mainly on continental services from the River Tyne but also occasionally on the London service. She struck a mine on 29 August 1915, causing the death of 2 crewmembers. The vessel was towed to Great Yarmouth roads where she later sank.
Newmister/Dorian Coast	1925	967	Delivered by Hawthorn Leslie in 1925 as Newmister, and renamed Dorian Coast in 1946. Sold to the Eastern Navigation Company of Bombay and renamed Azadi, being broken up in 1951.
Alnwick	1929	1,400	Built by Swan Hunter, Wigham Richardson for the River Tyne - Rotterdam service. Switched to London service in 1932 but competition from motor coaches ended this trade in 1935 when the vessel was sold to Fred. Olsen & Co. Renamed Bali, she initially operated from Oslo / Kristiansand to Rotterdam. She survived World War II and was transferred to Olsen's service between Oslo and Newcastle until 1951 when she moved to an Antwerp service from Oslo /Kristiansand. Sold to the Burmese Shipping Board in 1952 and renamed Pyidawtha. She operated coastal passenger/cargo services out of Rangoon until 6 May 1955 when she grounded on a voyage to Akyat. The grounding led to her being declared a total loss.
Caster/Caspian Coast	1935	733	Built by Swan Hunter and delivered as Caster in 1939. Renamed Caspian Coast in 1946. Sold to London Scottish Line in 1947 and then to Maldives Interests in 1959, being renamed Maldive Crescent. She was wrecked, in 1967, on trip between Rangoon and East Pakistan, carrying a cargo of jute, near Cape Negrais, and was abandoned.
