= MV Ulster Monarch =

British ferry and landing ship

History
- Name: MV Ulster Monarch (1929-1966); HMS Ulster Monarch (F69) (1941-1946)
- Owner: Belfast Steamship Company
- Port of registry: Belfast
- Route: Liverpool-Belfast (1929–1966)
- Builder: Harland and Wolff
- Yard number: 635
- Launched: 24 January 1929
- Completed: 10 June 1929
- Identification: Official No.148163
- Fate: Scrapped in 1966

General characteristics
- Tonnage: 3,791 GRT
- Length: 345 ft (105.2 m)
- Beam: 46 ft (14.0 m)
- Draught: 4.13 m (13.5 ft)
- Installed power: 10 cylinder airless injection H&W B&W
- Propulsion: Twin screws
- Speed: 17 knots (31 km/h; 20 mph)

MV Ulster Monarch was a passenger ferry operated across the Irish Sea between 1929 and 1966 apart from wartime service as an infantry landing ship, HMS Ulster Monarch.

== History ==
Ulster Monarch was the first of three 3700ton motorships built by Harland and Wolff for the Belfast Steamship Co. between 1929 and 1930. She and her sisters, Ulster Prince and Ulster Queen, were pioneer diesel-propelled cross-channel passenger ships. Her original grey hull was later changed to black.

Ulster Monarch was requisitioned by Admiralty in October 1940, initially as a stores carrier. In 1942, she was converted into an infantry landing ship. HMS Ulster Monarch (F69) carried six Landing Craft Assault craft and was able to transport up to 580 troops. She was armed with a 12-pdr, 2 × 2-pdr and 4 × 20 mm anti-aircraft guns.

Ulster Monarch's war record included a circumnavigation of Africa. She took part in the first landing of troops on the Italian mainland and the D-Day landings. She was part of convoy WS 11X, a troop convoy from Liverpool / Clyde to Gibraltar preparing for Operation Halberd.

The ship was returned to her owners in October 1945, the only one of the trio to resume the Irish Sea service after the war. Her funnels were shortened in an attempt to improve stability by reducing top weight. She continued in service until shortly before being broken up at Ghent, Belgium in 1966.

== Service ==
- Liverpool – Belfast (1929–1940)
- wartime service
- Liverpool – Belfast (1946–1966)
