= HMS Ulster Queen =

British ferry and auxiliary cruiser (1930–1950)

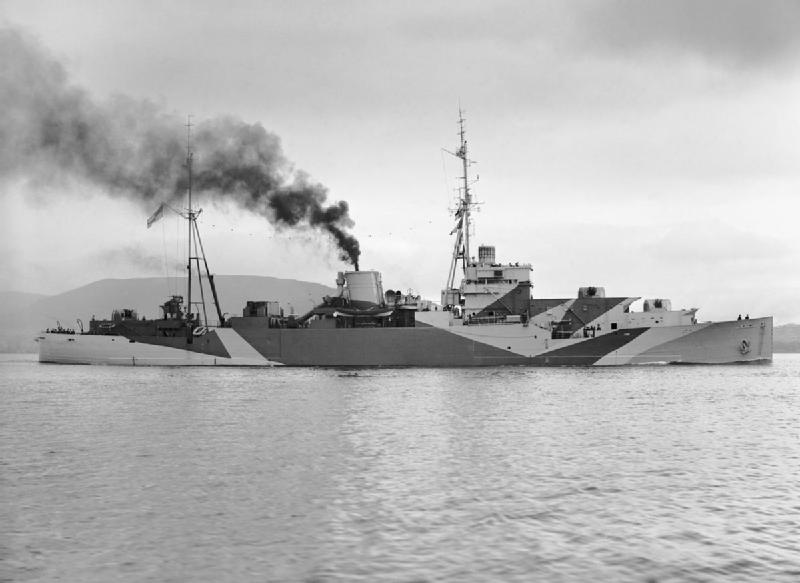
- HMS Ulster Queen on coastal waters, 8 June 1943

History
- Name: MV Ulster Queen (1930–1941); HMS Ulster Queen (1941–1946)
- Owner: Belfast Steamship Company
- Port of registry: Belfast
- Route: Liverpool-Belfast (1930–1940)
- Builder: Harland and Wolff
- Yard number: 696
- Launched: 28 March 1929
- Completed: 11 February 1930
- Identification: Official No.161857
- Fate: Scrapped 1950

General characteristics
- Tonnage: 3,756 GRT
- Length: 345 ft (105.2 m)
- Beam: 46 ft (14.0 m)
- Draught: 4.13 m (13.5 ft)
- Installed power: 10 cylinder airless injection H&W B&W
- Propulsion: Twin
- Speed: 17 knots (31 km/h; 20 mph)

MV Ulster Queen was a passenger ferry operated across the Irish Sea between 1930 and 1940. She became an auxiliary anti-aircraft cruiser, HMS Ulster Queen and never returned to civilian service.

== History ==
The Belfast Steamship Co. received three 3,700 ton Harland and Wolff-built motorships in 1929 and 1930, the world's first diesel cross-channel ships. Ulster Queen was the second of these.

Ulster Queen ran aground off Maughold Head on the Isle of Man on 28 February 1940. She was refloated on 27 March and taken to Belfast for repairs.

Requisitioned by the Admiralty as an auxiliary anti-aircraft cruiser, she was substantially modified. Her boat deck and one funnel were removed and armour plating was added to the hull. She was armed with six 4-inch guns in three turrets and smaller AA weapons. Commissioned as HMS Ulster Queen, she was purchased outright by the Admiralty and served with the Russian convoys, in the Mediterranean and in the Far East before being paid off on 1 April 1946. The modifications were too substantial for her to return to passenger service. She was laid up, and eventually scrapped in 1950.

== Service ==
- Liverpool - Belfast (1930 - 1940)
- Wartime service with the Russian convoys, in the Mediterranean and in the Far East.
