= Coast Lines =

Coast Lines Ltd
- Industry: Shipping
- Founded: 1917
- Founder: Owen Philipps, 1st Baron Kylsant
- Defunct: 1971
- Successor: P&O Ferries
- Headquarters: Liverpool
- Area served: England, Ireland, Wales, Scotland, Channel Islands

Coast Lines Limited provided shipping services in the United Kingdom, Ireland and the Channel Islands from 1917 to 1971.

== History ==
Powell, Bacon and Hough Lines Ltd was formed in 1913 in Liverpool. The name of Coast Lines Limited was adopted in 1917, when the company was purchased by the Royal Mail Steam Packet Company at a cost of £800,000 (equivalent to £47,984,455 in 2025).

In 1931, the Royal Mail Steam Packet Company was dissolved after an accounting scandal which led to the imprisonment of chairman Lord Kylsant for misrepresenting the state of the company to shareholders. Coast Lines achieved independence under the chairmanship of Sir Alfred Read (1871–1955), who had previously built up the family shipping business of F. H. Powell & Co., and then been managing director of Coast Lines from 1917.

From 1917 to 1951, Coast Lines acquired a controlling interest in a large number of coastal shipping companies, eventually numbering about twenty, of which the most important were:

- British and Irish Steam Packet Company (1917)
- City of Cork Steam Packet Company (1918)
- Laird Lines (1919)
- Belfast Steamship Company (1919)
- Tedcastle McCormick and Company (1919)
- City of Dublin Steam Packet Company (1919)
- Ayr Steam Shipping Company (1919)
- G & J Burns Ltd (1920)
- Burns Steamship Company (1920)
- Ardrossan Harbour Company (1920)
- Little Western Steamship Company (1920)
- London Welsh Steamship Company (1924)
- British Motor Ship Company (1925)
- John Westcott Ltd (1925)
- Dundalk and Newry Steam Packet Company (1926)
- Michael Murphy Limited (1926)
- David MacBrayne Ltd (jointly with the London, Midland and Scottish Railway) (1928)
- Tyne Tees Steam Shipping Company (1943)
- North of Scotland, Orkney & Shetland Steam Navigation Company (1961)

By 1951, the company operated a fleet of 109 ships, which carried over four million tons of cargo, over half a million head of livestock, and more than a million passengers.

The British and Irish Steam Packet Company and the City of Cork Steam Packet Company were sold off in 1965 to the Irish Government.

The remains of the company was acquired by P&O Ferries in 1971.
