= Lissens Goods station =

Railway freight facility in Scotland

Lissens Goods
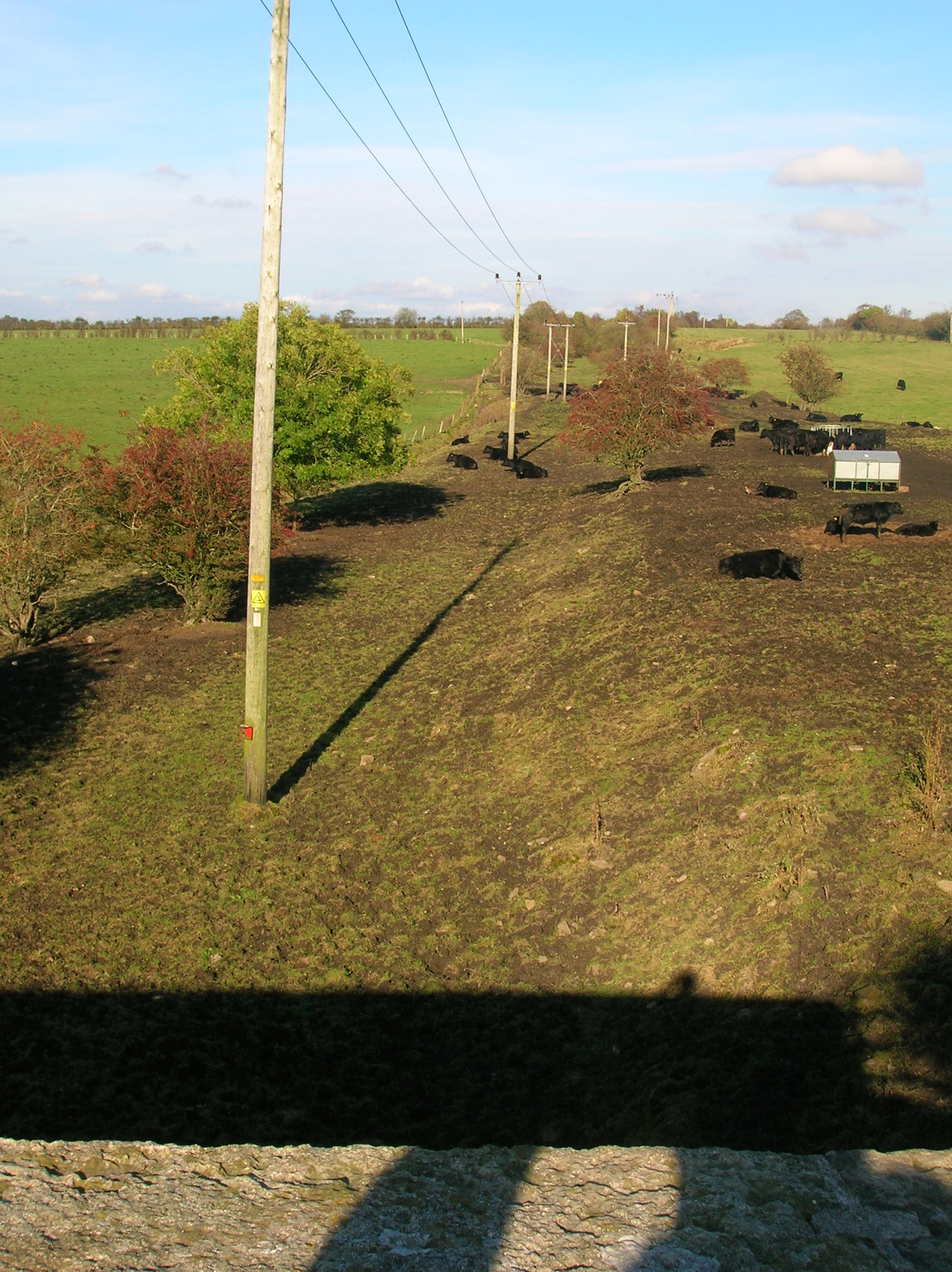
- The site of Lissens Goods station

General information
- Location: Near Auchentiber, Ayrshire; Scotland
- Coordinates: 55.688083°N 4.661282°W
- Grid reference: NS328470

Other information
- Status: Disused

History
- Original company: L&A
- Pre-grouping: CR
- Post-grouping: LMS

Key dates
- 3 September 1888: Opened
- 17 December 1950: Goods services withdrawn
Location

Lissens Goods station or Lissens Sidings station was a railway freight facility located approximately two miles north-east of Kilwinning, North Ayrshire, Scotland. It served the industrial and agricultural requirements for transportation in the vicinity of Auchenmade and the surrounding rural area on behalf of the Lanarkshire and Ayrshire Railway. Lissens Goods was around seven miles from the Lugton East Junction and the railway workers employed here were supervised by staff from the nearby Auchenmade Station, the nearest passenger and goods station on the up line towards Lugton and Glasgow.

Although a remote location today the facility would have had freight transport business in the form of lime for the fields, cattle, horse and sheep movements, milk and cheese delivery, mining and quarrying related items, etc. with other sidings in the vicinity, namely Lylestone.

== Infrastructure ==
The OS maps of 1896 and 1910 show a fairly significant infrastructure for such a remote location with the double track main line and three sidings running off to a loading dock and what may have been a goods shed. A brick built 16 lever (in 1919) signal box was situated on the main line with six semaphore signal posts, two ground disc signals, a weighing machine, a cistern, a row of three workers cottages and a square outside toilet block and coal shed. Nearby Lylestone siding had a two lever groundframe.

== History ==
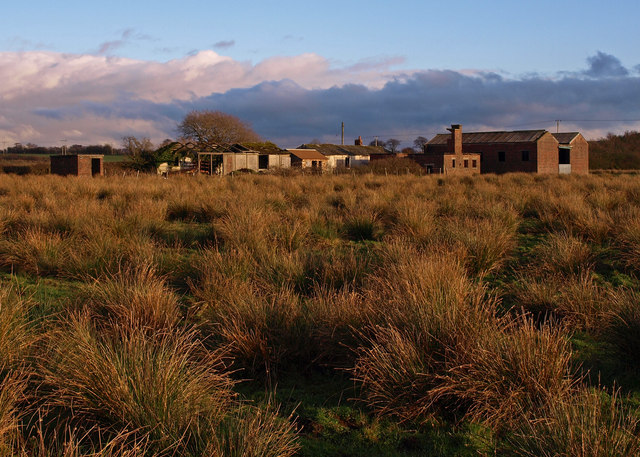
The WW2 'Tyre Burning Facility' near Lissens.

As stated Lissens Goods station lay down the line towards Ardrossan, supervised by staff at Auchenmade Station and closed at the same time as the goods facility at Auchenmade, the passenger station here having finally closed in 1932. Goods trains ran along this line until 30 March 1953. Boat trains to Ardrossan ran along this line until 1939.

By 1958 the sidings had been lifted although the signal box was still marked and only a single track was still present on the main line.

A feature of WWII was the use of the line for what locals called the night time 'Ghost Trains' that carried injured service personnel to the Glasgow hospitals from where they had been landed at the port of Ardrossan.

The goods station at Lissens opened on 3 September 1888 and closed on 17 December 1950.

Opened by the Lanarkshire and Ayrshire Railway, then joining the Caledonian Railway it became part of the London Midland and Scottish Railway during the Grouping of 1923.

=== Workings details ===
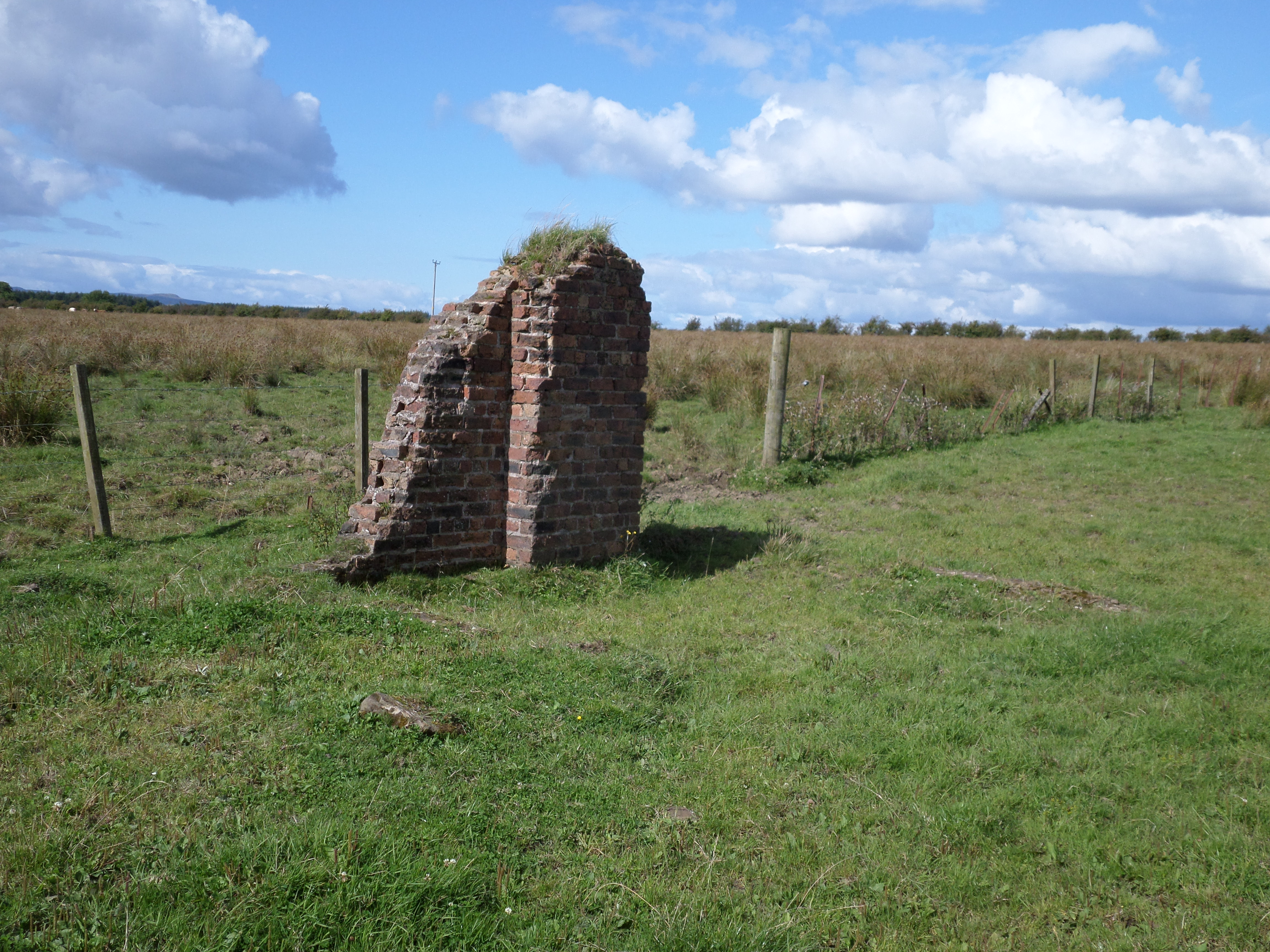
The remnants of Lissens Signalbox

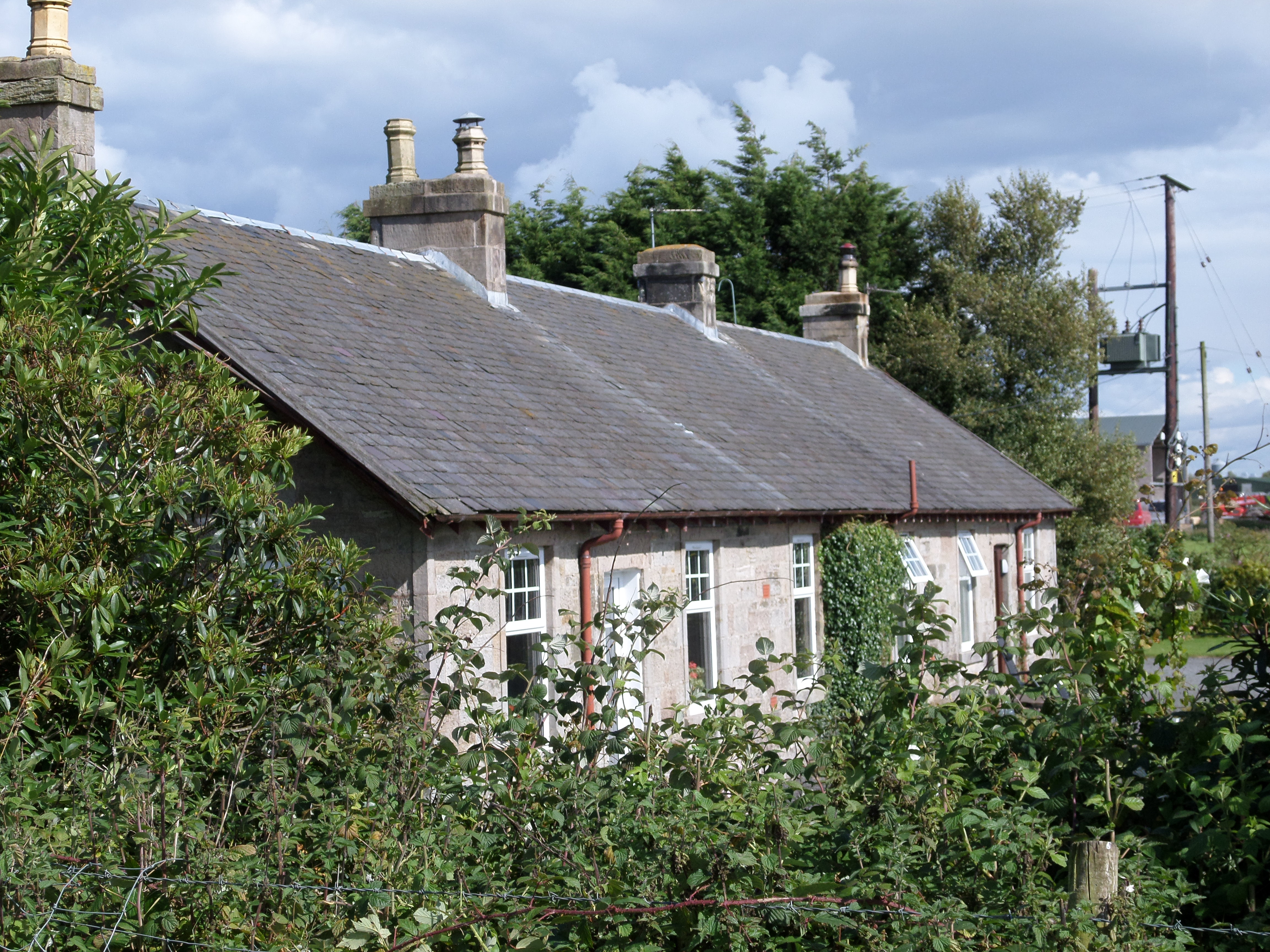
The railway workers cottages.

The May 1915 'Appendix' to the Caledonian Railway Working Timetable states of the Lylestone Siding that - This Siding will be worked by Up Trains only. It is controlled by a Staff Key which is kept in charge of the Signalman at Lissens Siding. When a train which is to work Lylestone Siding arrives at Lissens, it must be stopped at the signal Box, when the Engine will be detached, and the Brakesman in charge will see that the Train is secured by the Van Brake being hard on, and the Front wagons held by Sprags in their wheels. The Brakesman in charge will then get the Staff Key from the signalman, and go forward to Lylestone Siding with the Engine and any Wagons there may be for the Siding, and he will work the points as required. After the work is finished, and Sidings points properly set for the Main Line, the Engine will propel the Wagons taken from Lylestone Siding on the Up Line to Lissens, where they will be run into the Siding by gravitation. The Brakesman will return with the engine to Lissens, and will hand the Staff key back to the Signalman, after which the ordinary working will resume.

=== Tyre burning facility ===
A WW2 'Tyre Burning Facility' was located very near to Lissens Goods that may have provided war time traffic for the goods station. Later the site of the South Lissens Pottery, local intelligence has it that a munitions depot was located here and that the large number of tyres waiting to be processed were actually to camouflage the depot. Ruins of the facility are still (2014) located in one of the South Lissens Farm fields.

== The site today ==
The row of three railway workers cottages survive as private residences and the loading dock is still a prominent structure in this otherwise somewhat featureless landscape near Lissens Moss. The railway fencing and gate survive as does the substantial road overbridge. The signalbox's old chimney partly remains as do the foundations and the cistern.

Preceding station	Historical railways	Following station
Kilwinning; Line and station closed	Caledonian Railway; Lanarkshire and Ayrshire Railway	Auchenmade; Line and station closed
