= Saltcoats North railway station =

Former railway station in Scotland

Saltcoats North
- A view of the station looking west c. 1914

General information
- Location: Saltcoats, Ayrshire; Scotland
- Coordinates: 55.6393°N 4.7893°W
- Grid reference: NS244419
- Platforms: 2

Other information
- Status: Disused

History
- Original company: Lanarkshire and Ayrshire Railway
- Pre-grouping: Caledonian Railway

Key dates
- 3 September 1888: Opened as Saltcoats
- 1 January 1917: Closed
- 1 February 1919: Reopened
- 2 July 1924: Renamed Saltcoats North
- 4 July 1932: Closed to regular services
Location

Saltcoats North railway station was a railway station serving the town of Saltcoats, North Ayrshire, Scotland as part of the Lanarkshire and Ayrshire Railway.

== History ==
The station opened on 3 September 1888 and was simply known as Saltcoats. It closed between 1 January 1917 and 1 February 1919 due to wartime economy, and upon the grouping of the L&AR into the London, Midland and Scottish Railway in 1923, the station was renamed Saltcoats North on 2 June 1924. The station closed to passengers on 4 July 1932, however it was reopened for a time within two years when a special return fare price was introduced. The line saw use for trains going to Ardrossan Montgomerie Pier and the Ardrossan Shell Mex plant until 1968.

== Station description ==
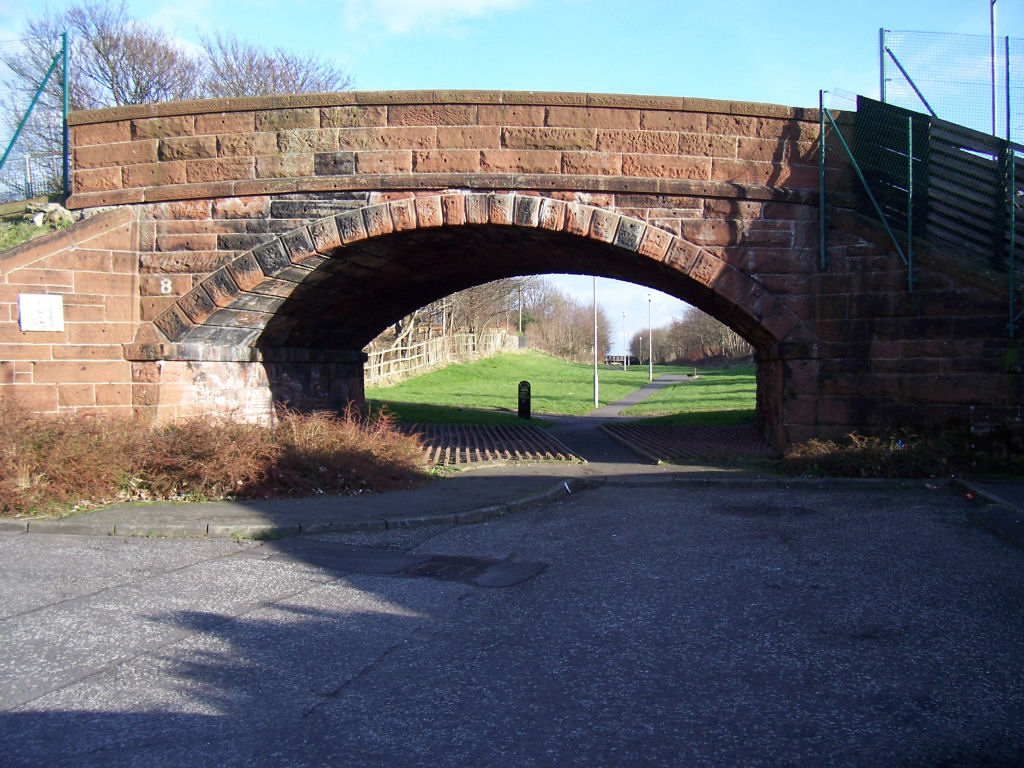
The adjacent road bridge in 2006

The station consisted of two side platforms connected by a footbridge and with a small building on each side. By 1956 the footbridge and the building on the eastboard platform had been removed, however the westbound building remained intact albeit derelict. By the late 1960s only the overgrown platforms remained.

A goods yard and signal box stood on the Ardrossan side of the station, accessed off Caledonia Road, with a four sidings, loading dock, goods shed, crane and weighing machine.

== Redevelopment ==
Since demolition, the site of Saltcoats North has been redeveloped into a housing estate. Most of the trackbed between the station and Stevenston Moorpark station has been filled in and converted into a pathway signposted as 'Old Caley Line'. Several road bridges that crossed the line here are still in existence, though are now partially buried in the ground. Aside from the road bridge that was directly adjacent to the station, there is no trace left of the station itself.

Preceding station	Historical railways	Following station
Ardrossan North; Line and station closed	Caledonian Railway; Lanarkshire and Ayrshire Railway	Stevenston Moorpark; Line and station closed
