= Stevenston Moorpark railway station =

Former railway station in Scotland

Stevenston Moorpark
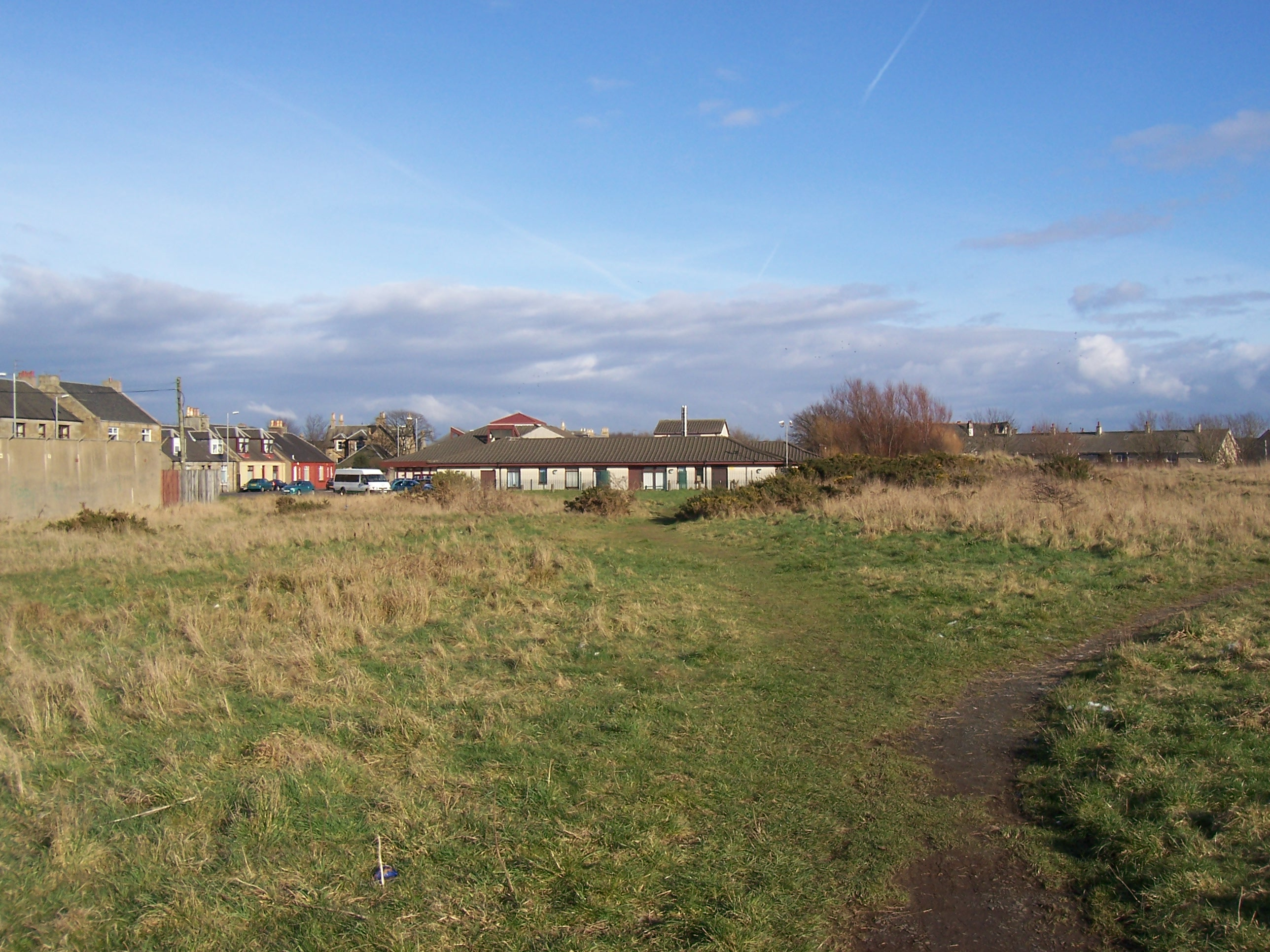
- The site of Stevenston Moorpark in 2006

General information
- Location: Stevenston, Ayrshire; Scotland
- Coordinates: 55.6353°N 4.7555°W
- Grid reference: NS265414
- Platforms: 2

Other information
- Status: Disused

History
- Original company: Lanarkshire and Ayrshire Railway
- Pre-grouping: Caledonian Railway

Key dates
- 3 September 1888: Opened as Stevenston
- 1 January 1917: Closed
- 1 February 1919: Reopened
- 2 July 1924: Renamed Stevenston Moorpark
- 4 July 1932: Closed to regular services
Location

Stevenston Moorpark railway station was a railway station serving the town of Stevenston, North Ayrshire, Scotland as part of the Lanarkshire and Ayrshire Railway (L&AR).

== History ==
The station opened on 3 September 1888 and was simply known as Stevenston. It closed between 1 January 1917 and 1 February 1919 due to wartime economy, and upon the grouping of the L&AR into the London, Midland and Scottish Railway in 1923, the station was renamed Stevenston Moorpark on 2 June 1924. The station closed to passengers on 4 July 1932, however it was reopened for a time within two years when a special return fare price was introduced. The line saw use for trains going to Ardrossan Montgomerie Pier and the Ardrossan Shell Mex plant until 1968.

Today the site of Stevenston Moorpark is occupied by Caley Court, a residential home named after L&AR owners Caledonian Railway.

Preceding station	Historical railways	Following station
Saltcoats; Line and station closed	Caledonian Railway; Lanarkshire and Ayrshire Railway	Kilwinning; Line and station closed
Saltcoats; Line and station closed	Caledonian Railway; Lanarkshire and Ayrshire Railway	Ardeer Platform; Line and station closed
