= Kilwinning East railway station =

Former railway station in Scotland

Kilwinning East

General information
- Location: Kilwinning, Ayrshire; Scotland
- Coordinates: 55.6543°N 4.7035°W
- Grid reference: NS299434
- Platforms: 3

Other information
- Status: Disused

History
- Original company: Lanarkshire and Ayrshire Railway
- Pre-grouping: Caledonian Railway
- Post-grouping: London, Midland and Scottish Railway

Key dates
- 3 September 1888: Opened as Kilwinning
- 1 January 1917: Closed
- 1 February 1919: Reopened
- 2 July 1924: Renamed Kilwinning East
- 4 July 1932: Closed to regular services
Location

Kilwinning East railway station was a railway station serving the town of Kilwinning, North Ayrshire, Scotland as part of the Lanarkshire and Ayrshire Railway.

== History ==
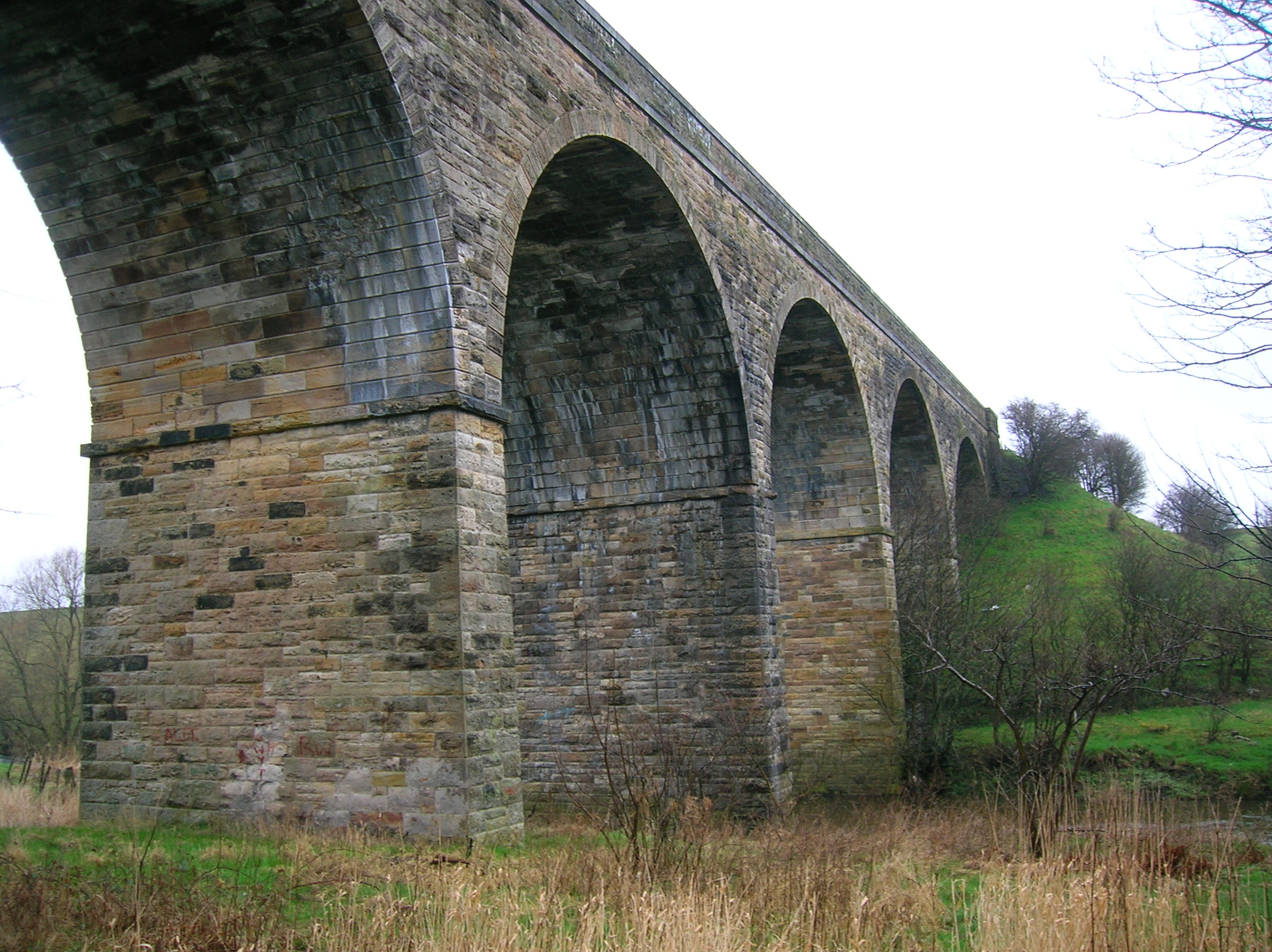
Kilwinning viaduct on the route leading to Kilwinning East Station.

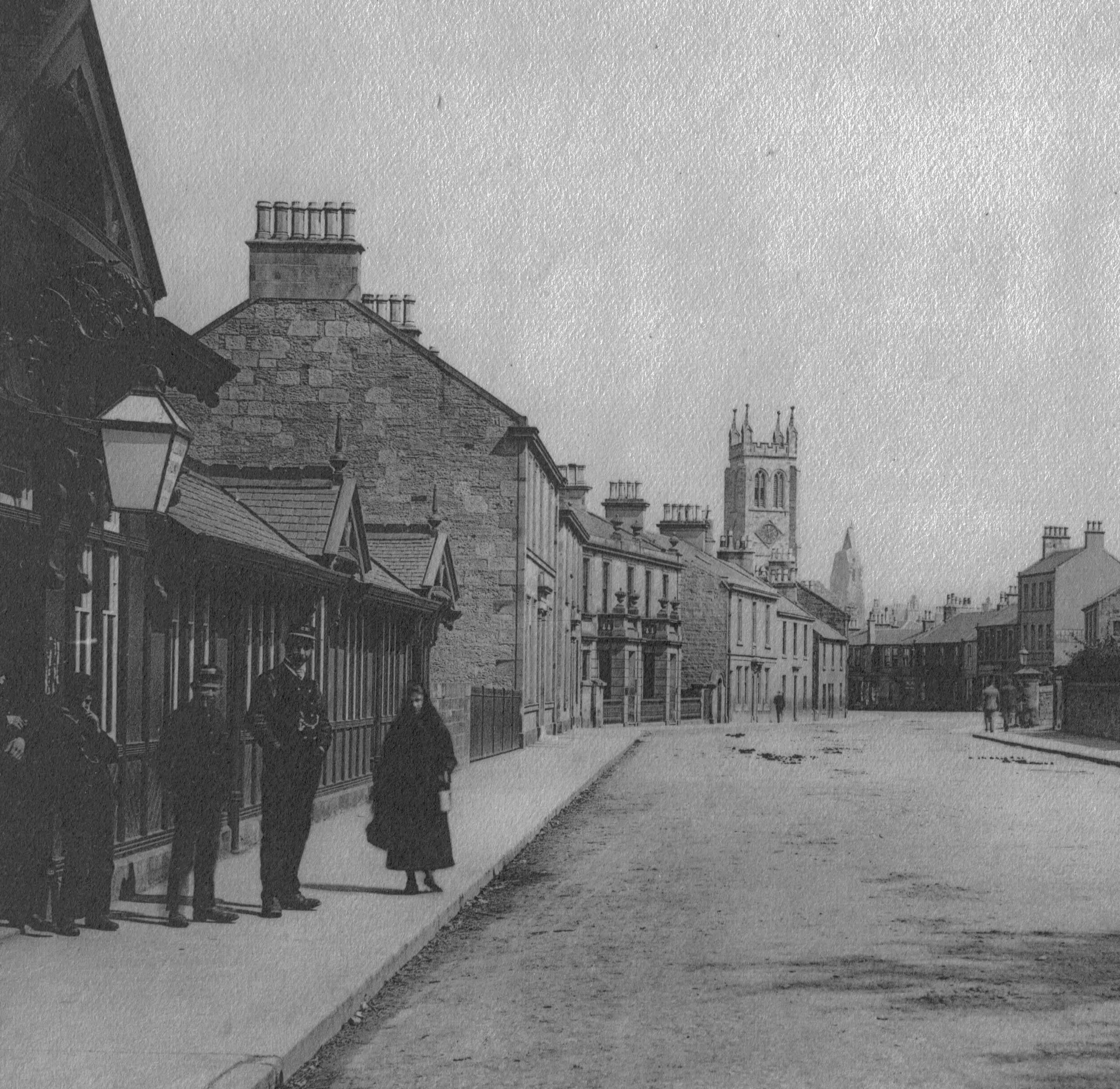
Kilwinning East Station entrance in 1910.

The station opened on 3 September 1888 and was simply known as Kilwinning. It closed between 1 January 1917 and 1 February 1919 due to wartime economy, and upon the grouping of the L&AR into the London, Midland and Scottish Railway in 1923, the station was renamed Kilwinning East on 2 June 1924. The station closed permanently to regular passenger traffic on 4 July 1932.

Today there is no trace of this station, and the site is occupied by Caley House (named after L&AR owners Caledonian Railway) and the Cornerstone Church. Garnock Viaduct at the extreme north of the town is the only physical reminder that Kilwinning was once served by this line.

| Preceding station | Historical railways | Following station |
|---|---|---|
| Stevenston; Line and station closed | Caledonian Railway; Lanarkshire and Ayrshire Railway | Auchenmade; Line and station closed |
| Bogside; Line and station closed | Caledonian Railway; Lanarkshire and Ayrshire Railway | Auchenmade; Line and station closed |
