= Ardrossan North railway station =

Disused railway station in Ardrossan, Ayrshire

Ardrossan North
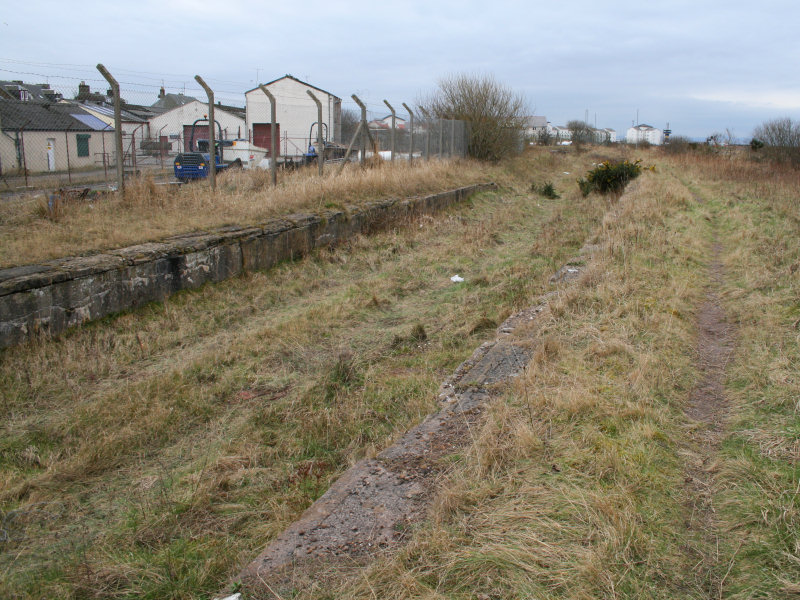
- Platform remains at Ardrossan North in 2008

General information
- Location: Ardrossan, Ayrshire; Scotland
- Coordinates: 55.6442°N 4.8147°W
- Grid reference: NS228425
- Platforms: 4

Other information
- Status: Disused

History
- Original company: Lanarkshire and Ayrshire Railway
- Pre-grouping: Caledonian Railway
- Post-grouping: LMS

Key dates
- 3 September 1888: Opened as Ardrossan
- 1 October 1906: Renamed Ardrossan Town
- 1 January 1917: Closed
- 1 February 1919: Reopened
- 2 July 1924: Renamed Ardrossan North
- 4 July 1932: Closed to regular services
Location

Ardrossan North railway station was a railway station serving the town of Ardrossan, North Ayrshire, Scotland as part of the Lanarkshire and Ayrshire Railway (L&AR). The station was the original Ardrossan terminus for this line until the nearby pier station opened two years later.

== History ==
The station opened on 3 September 1888 and was simply known as Ardrossan. The opening ceremony for the L&AR was held here, with the first passenger train service also departing here for Glasgow. On 1 October 1906 the station became known as Ardrossan Town, and was later closed between 1 January 1917 and 1 February 1919 due to wartime economy.

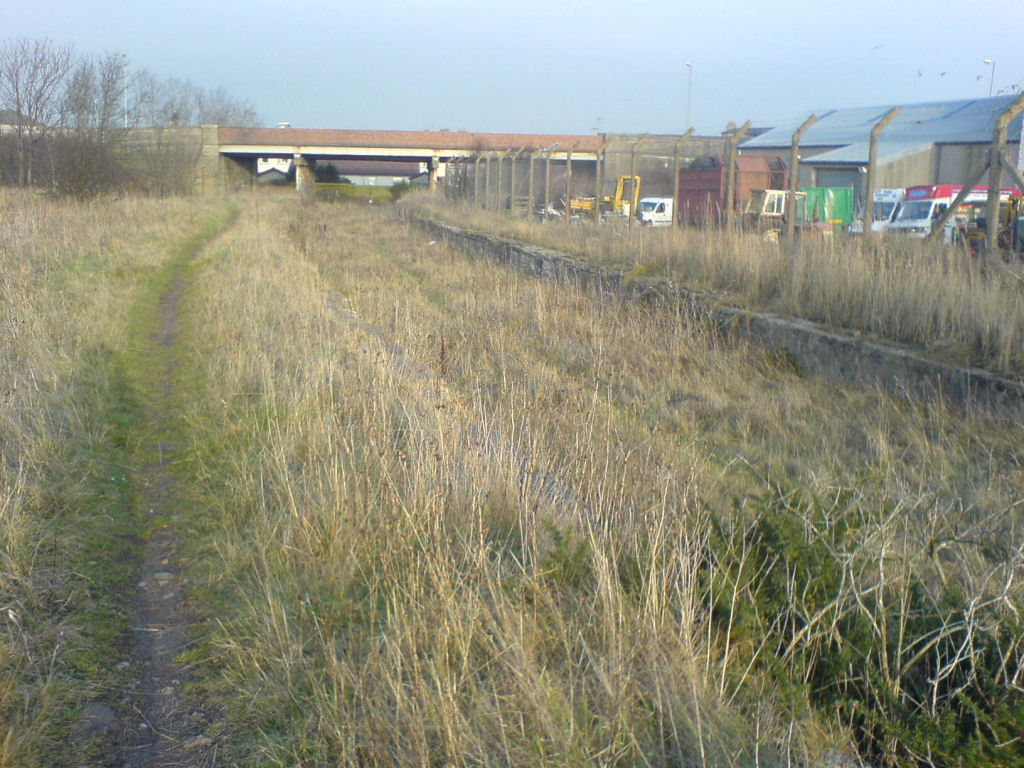
The remains of the station in 2006

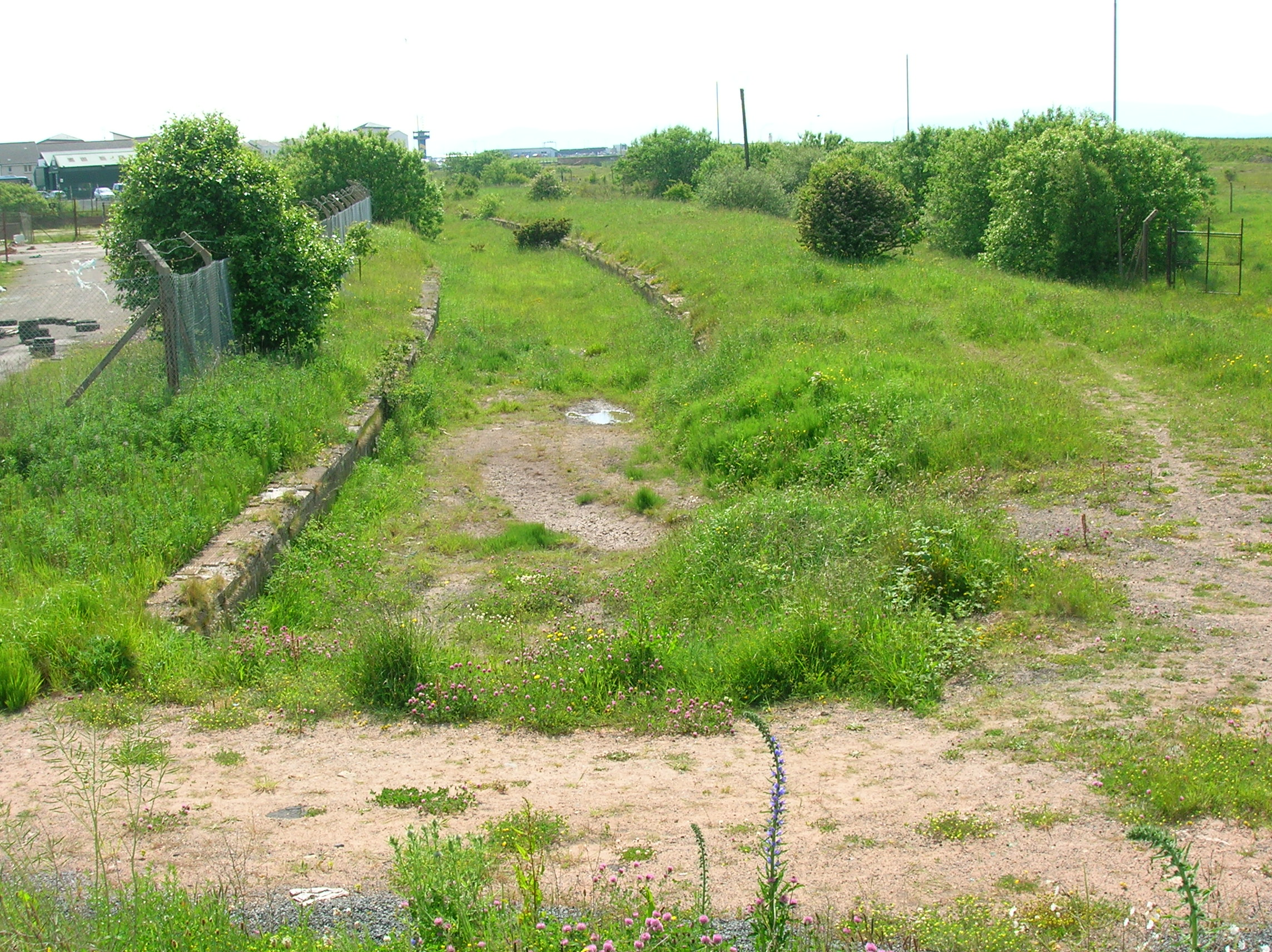
The remains of the station from the site of the old roadbridge in 2009.

Joining the Caledonian Railway, the L&AR was absorbed into the London, Midland and Scottish Railway during the Grouping of 1923. The station was renamed Ardrossan North on 2 June 1924. Other alternative names for the station were Ardrossan Montgomerie Street and Ardrossan Caledonian. The station closed to regular passenger services on 4 July 1932, however it was used for special passenger services until 1939. The line was taken into the Scottish Region of British Railways on nationalisation in 1948, seeing use for trains going to Montgomerie Pier and the nearby Shell Mex plant until 1968. All of the track north of the station was removed in 1970, however the spur line from the former Ardrossan Railway to the south remained intact serving the nearby bitumen plant until the 1980s.

Today parts of the station platforms are still in existence, though heavily overgrown. The site of the station building is now occupied by the depot for Clyde Coast Coaches. The bridge that passed over the station was demolished in March 2008 and platforms underneath partially removed. The platforms remained until 2017, when they made way for a new housing development.

Preceding station	Historical railways	Following station
Ardrossan Montgomerie Pier; Line and station closed	Caledonian Railway; Lanarkshire and Ayrshire Railway	Saltcoats North; Line and station closed
