= Bogside Moor Halt railway station =

Disused railway station in Irvine, Ayrshire

Bogside Moor Halt

General information
- Location: Near Irvine, Ayrshire; Scotland
- Coordinates: 55.6275°N 4.6790°W
- Grid reference: NS313403
- Platforms: 2

Other information
- Status: Disused

History
- Original company: Lanarkshire and Ayrshire Railway
- Pre-grouping: Caledonian Railway

Key dates
- 1893: opened for restricted use
- 1909: opened for public use
- 1 January 1917: Closed
- 1 February 1919: Reopened
- 2 July 1924: Renamed Bogside Moor Halt
- 28 July 1930: Closed to regular services
Location

Bogside Moor Halt railway station was a railway station near the town of Irvine, North Ayrshire, Scotland. The station was part of the Lanarkshire and Ayrshire Railway.

== History ==
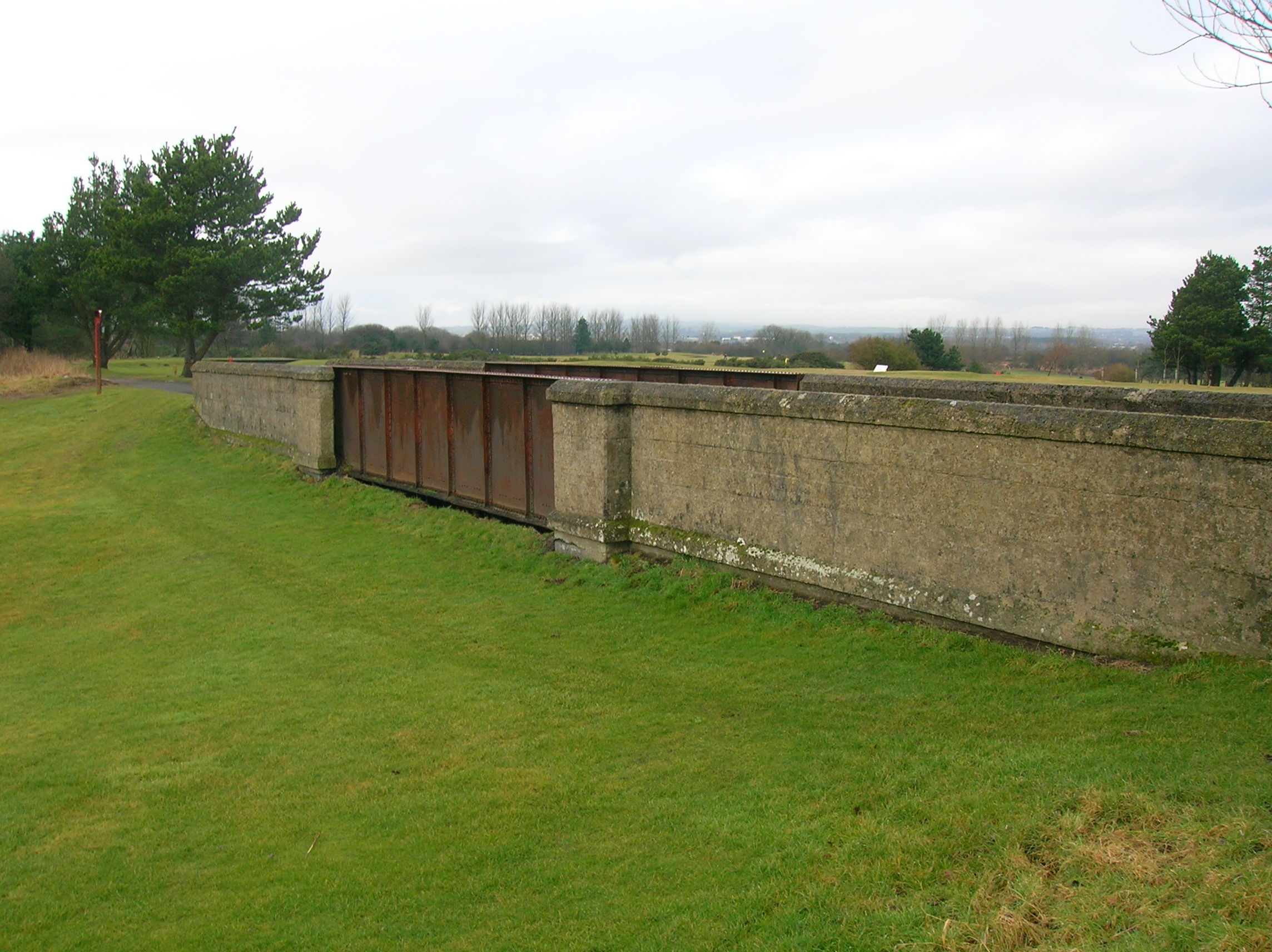
Old railway bridge near Bogside.

Located adjacent to the Cadgers' Racecourse on the town moor, this station was open for restricted used by 1893 as Bogside Platform. It was renamed Bogside and opened to the general public sometime before September 1909. The station closed between 1 January 1917 and 1 February 1919 due to wartime economy, and upon the grouping of the L&AR into the London, Midland and Scottish Railway in 1923 it was renamed Bogside Moor Halt on 2 June 1924. Trains only called at this station upon request. The station closed to passengers on 28 July 1930, but the line saw use for freight trains going to Irvine until 1939.

No trace of this station exists today.

Preceding station	Historical railways	Following station
Irvine; Line and station closed	Caledonian Railway; Lanarkshire and Ayrshire Railway	Kilwinning; Line and station closed
