= Auchenmade railway station =

Disused railway station in Ayrshire, Scotland

Auchenmade
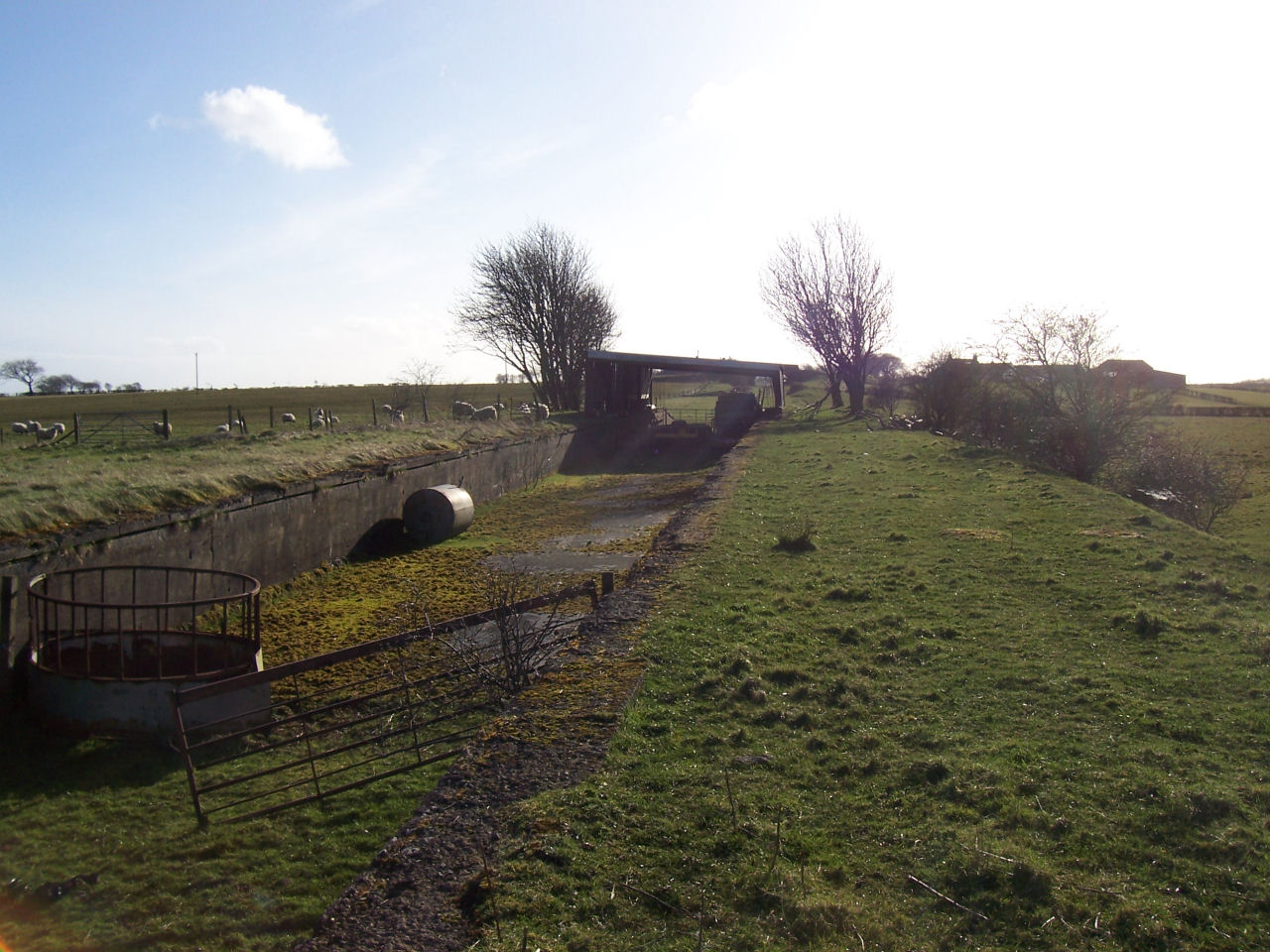
- The remains of Auchenmade in 2007

General information
- Location: Near Auchentiber, Ayrshire; Scotland
- Coordinates: 55.7010°N 4.6389°W
- Grid reference: NS342484
- Platforms: 2

Other information
- Status: Disused

History
- Original company: Lanarkshire and Ayrshire Railway
- Pre-grouping: Caledonian Railway
- Post-grouping: LMS

Key dates
- 3 September 1888: Opened
- 1 January 1917: Closed
- 2 March 1919: Reopened
- 4 July 1932: Closed to regular services
Location

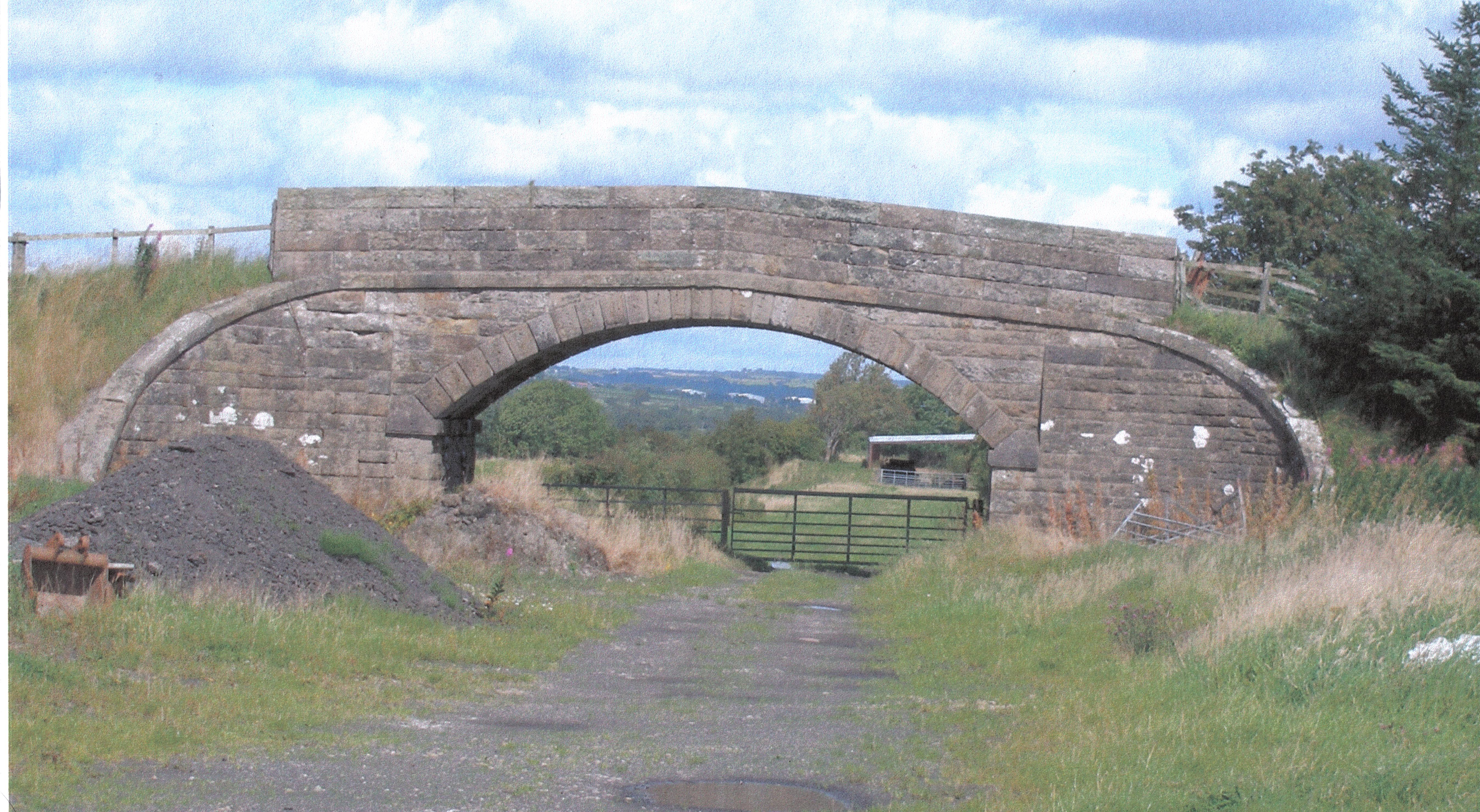
The overbridge at South Auchenmade Farm with the station remains in the background.

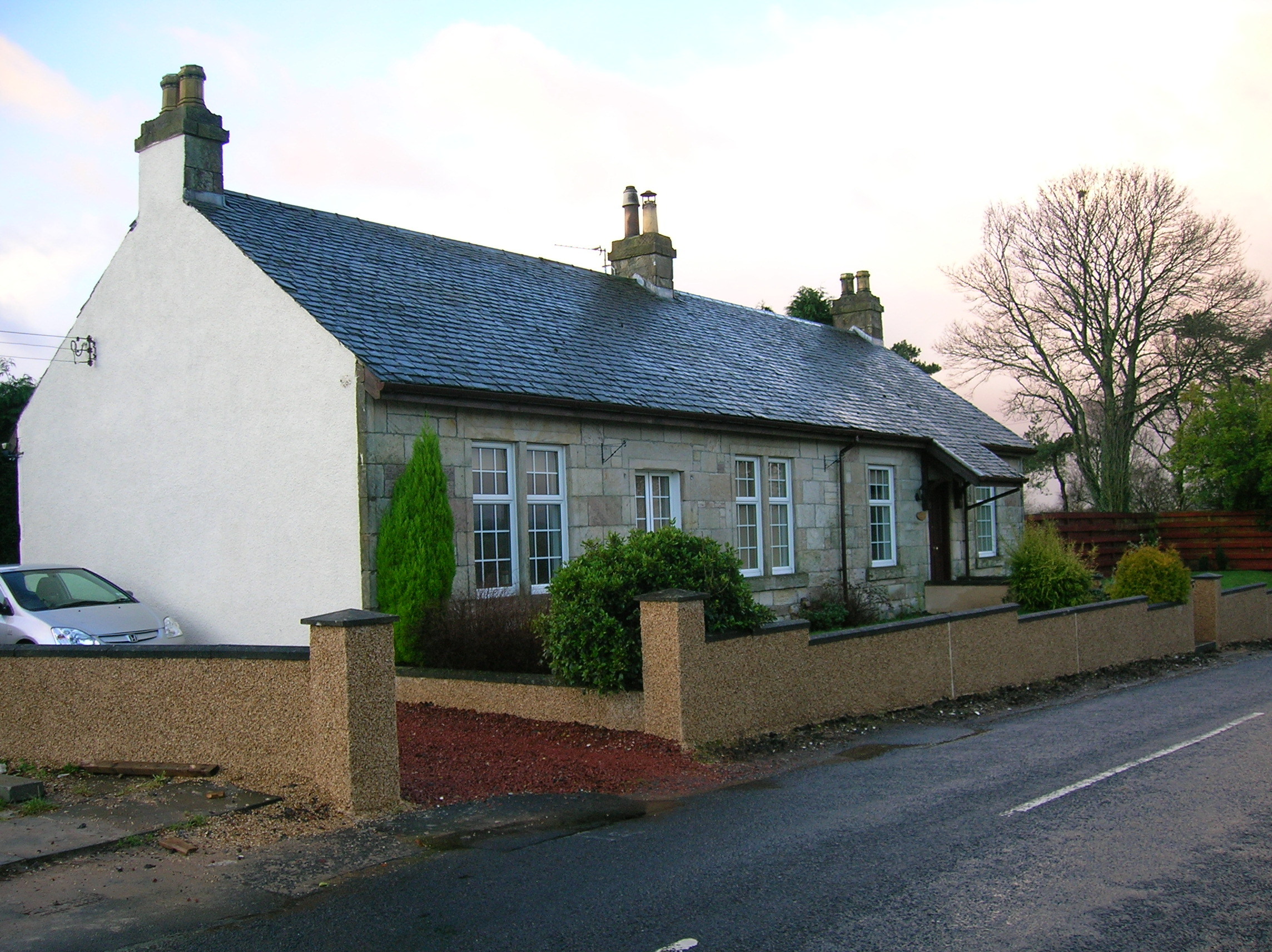
Old railway workers cottage at Auchenmade.

Auchenmade railway station was a railway station approximately three miles (4.8 km) north-east of Kilwinning on the B707, North Ayrshire, Scotland. It served the hamlet of Auchentiber and the surrounding rural area as part of the Lanarkshire and Ayrshire Railway. The station was 6.75 miles (10.86 km) from the Lugton East Junction.

== Infrastructure ==
The OS maps of 1896 and 1910 show a substantial infrastructure with a double-track mainline and four sidings running off to a loading dock and a goods shed with a crane, a signal box at the far end of the southern end of the eastern platform, signal posts, weighing machine, pedestrian overbridge and several platform buildings. In 1946 the main platform buildings were still substantially intact.

Until around 1909, the Auchenmade Quarry and Brickworks company operated a private siding here. The old clay quarry near South Auchenmade Farm is now flooded; little evidence of the brickworks and associated railway sidings remains.

Lissens Goods was the next railway site, a goods station, down the line towards Ardrossan, supervised by staff at Auchenmade Station and closed on 30 March 1953. Railway workers' cottages, similar to those at Auchenmade, still survive at Lissens.

The sidings operated at Lylestone Quarry were supervised by staff from Auchenmade Station.

Goods trains ran along this line until 30 March 1953, however in 1958 the sidings were still present.

== History ==
The station opened on 3 September 1888. It closed between 1 January 1917 and 2 March 1919 due to wartime economy, and closed permanently on 4 July 1932. Boat trains to Ardrossan ran along this line until 1939.

Opened by the Lanarkshire and Ayrshire Railway, then joining the Caledonian Railway it became part of the London Midland and Scottish Railway during the Grouping of 1923. It was then closed by that company.

A feature of World War II was the use of the line for what locals called the night time 'ghost trains' that carried injured service personnel to the Glasgow hospitals from where they had been landed at the port of Ardrossan.

== The site today ==
The platforms of Auchenmade station remain intact today as do the railway workers' cottages and the loading dock. The bridge abutments have been removed.

The station and it's grounds have been privately owned since 1966. It is now an occupied private residence.

Preceding station	Historical railways	Following station
Kilwinning; Line and station closed	Caledonian Railway; Lanarkshire and Ayrshire Railway	Giffen; Line and station closed
