= Irvine station =

Irvine station may refer to:

- Irvine Transportation Center, an Amtrak and Metrolink station in Irvine, California
- Irvine railway station, a National Rail station in Irvine, Scotland
- Irvine Bank Street railway station, a former station in Irvine, Scotland
