= Irvine Bank Street railway station =

Former railway station in Scotland

Irvine Bank Street
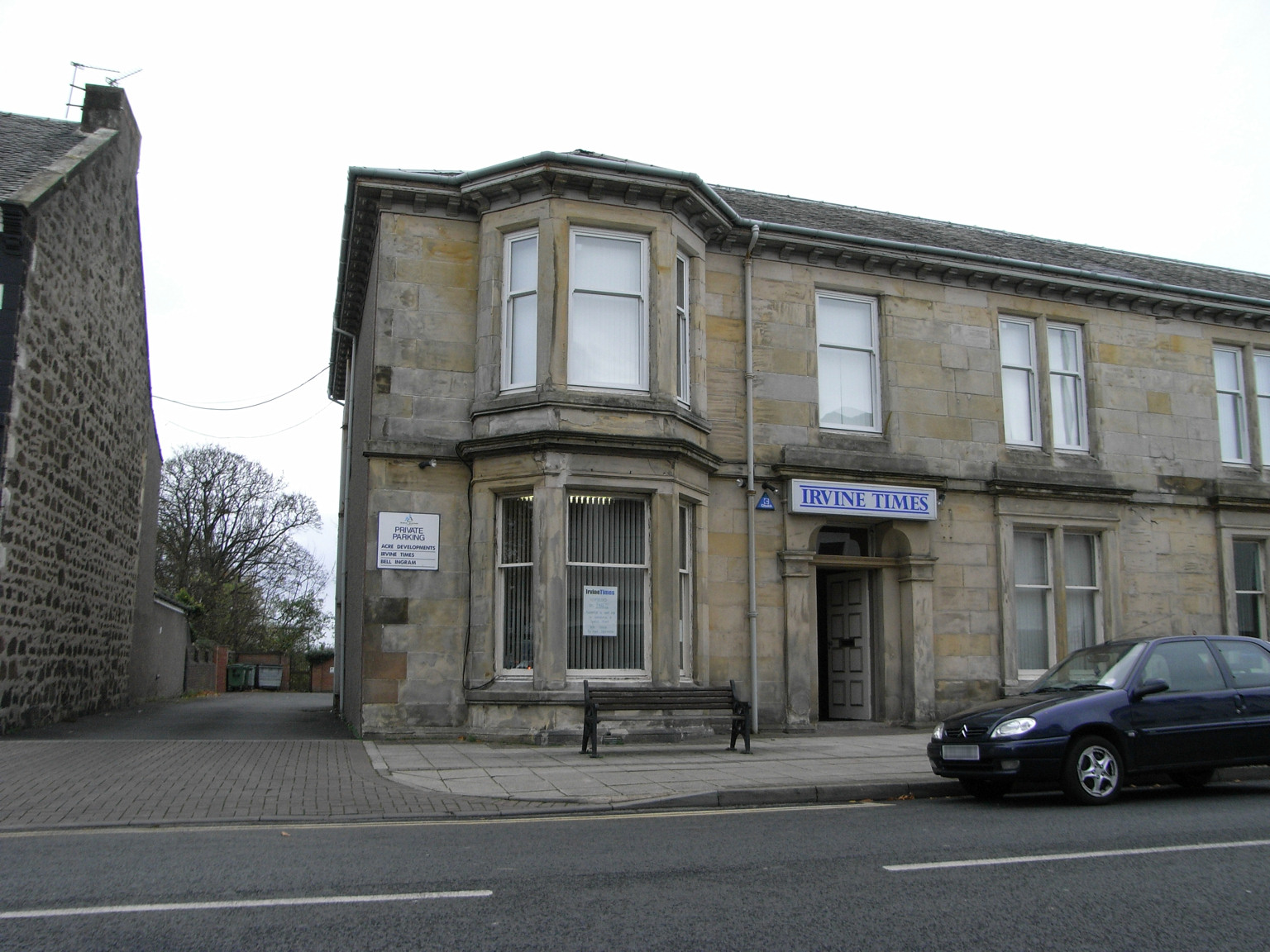
- The former station building in 2007

General information
- Location: Irvine, Ayrshire; Scotland
- Coordinates: 55.6162°N 4.6641°W
- Grid reference: NS322391
- Platforms: 2

Other information
- Status: Disused

History
- Original company: Lanarkshire and Ayrshire Railway
- Pre-grouping: Caledonian Railway
- Post-grouping: London, Midland and Scottish Railway

Key dates
- 2 June 1890: Opened
- 1 January 1917: Closed
- 1 February 1919: Reopened
- 2 July 1924: Renamed Irvine Bank Street
- 28 July 1930: Closed to regular services
Location

Irvine Bank Street railway station was a railway station serving the town of Irvine, North Ayrshire, Scotland as part of the Lanarkshire and Ayrshire Railway.

== History ==
The station opened on 2 June 1890, and was simply known as Irvine. It closed between 1 January 1917 and 1 February 1919 due to the wartime economy, and upon the grouping of the L&AR into the London, Midland, and Scottish Railway in 1923, the station was renamed Irvine Bank Street on 2 June, 1924. The station closed to passengers on 28 July, 1930, however, the line continued to be used for freight trains until 1939.

Parts of the former station buildings were used by the Irvine Times local newspaper.

Preceding station	Historical railways	Following station
Terminus	Caledonian Railway; Lanarkshire and Ayrshire Railway	Bogside; Line and station closed
