= Garnock Viaduct =

Bridge in North Ayrshire, Scotland

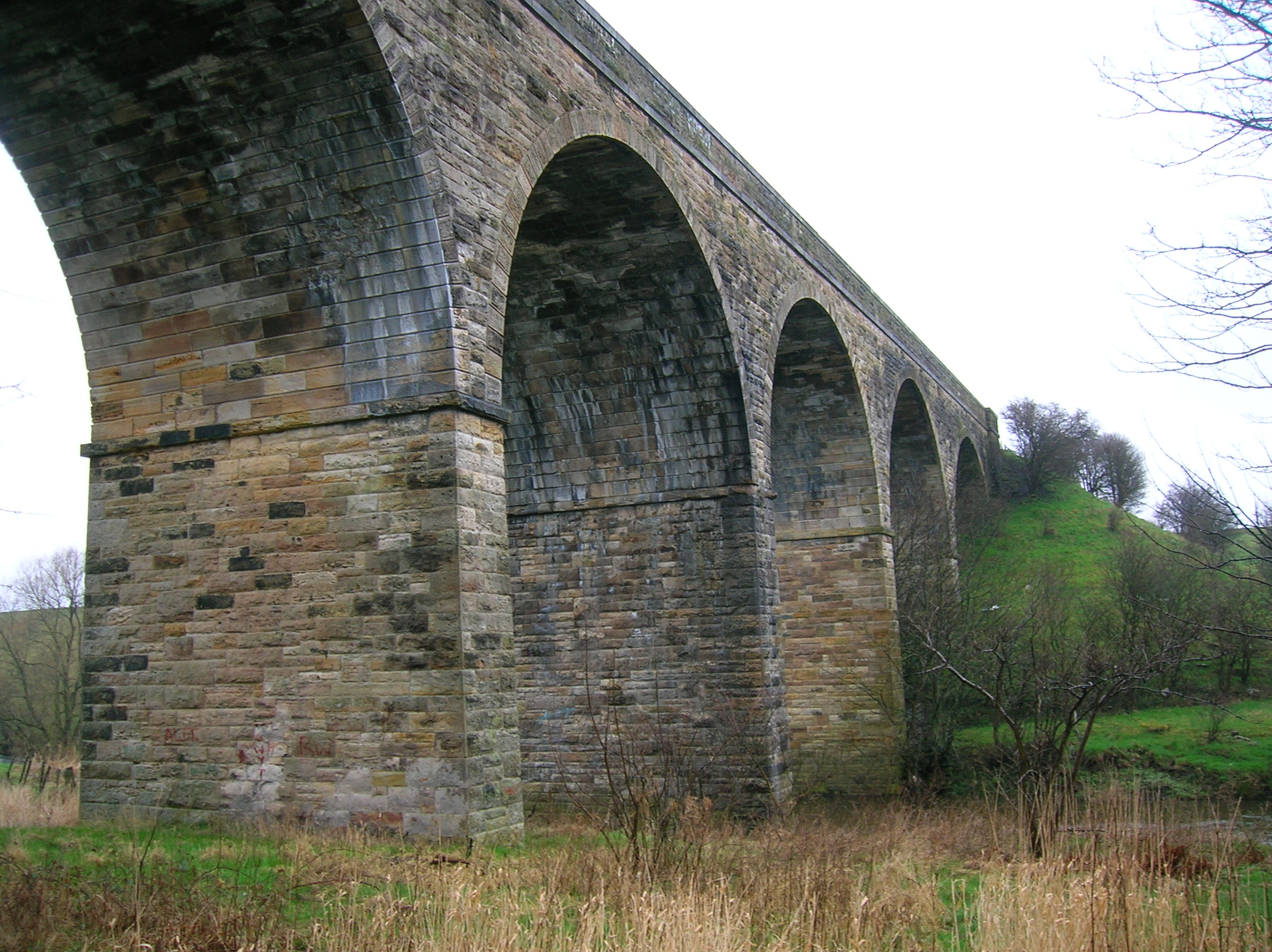
- Coordinates: 55°39′47.59″N 4°41′54.75″W
- Carries: 7
- Crosses: River Garnock
- Locale: North Ayrshire

Characteristics
- Design: Arch
- Material: Stone
- Total length: 122 metres (400 ft)
- Height: 25 metres (82 ft)
- No. of spans: 7

History
- Designer: Sir Robert McAlpine
- Construction end: 1888

Location
- Interactive map of Garnock Viaduct

Garnock Viaduct is a viaduct located to the north of Kilwinning in Scotland that crosses the River Garnock. It was completed in 1888 by the Lanarkshire and Ayrshire Railway. The line that it carried closed in 1953. It has since become part of National Cycle Route 7.

The bridge was constructed by Sir Robert McAlpine with stone from their nearby Auchenmeade quarry. The viaduct has seven arches each 15 metres (49 feet) long. It is 25 metres (82 feet) tall and has a total length of 122 metres (400 feet).

== See also ==
- List of bridges in Scotland
