= Ardrossan Montgomerie Pier railway station =

Disused railway station in Ardrossan, Ayrshire

Ardrossan Montgomerie Pier

General information
- Location: Ardrossan, Ayrshire; Scotland
- Coordinates: 55.6419°N 4.8209°W
- Grid reference: NS225423
- Platforms: 2

Other information
- Status: Disused

History
- Original company: Lanarkshire and Ayrshire Railway
- Pre-grouping: Caledonian Railway
- Post-grouping: LMS

Key dates
- 30 May 1890: Opened as Ardrossan Pier
- 1 January 1917: Closed
- 1 February 1919: Reopened
- 2 July 1924: Renamed Ardrossan Montgomerie Pier
- 6 May 1968: Closed
Location

Ardrossan Montgomerie Pier railway station was a railway station serving the town of Ardrossan, North Ayrshire, Scotland as part of the Lanarkshire and Ayrshire Railway (L&AR). The station was opened to compete with the Glasgow and South Western Railway (G&SWR) owned station at Winton Pier on the opposite side of the harbour.

== History ==
The station opened on 30 May 1890 as Ardrossan Pier, replacing the L&AR Ardrossan station as the new terminus for the line in Ardrossan (although that station would continue to operate as an intermediate station). It was closed from 1 January 1917 to 1 February 1919 due to wartime economy, and upon the grouping of the L&AR into the London, Midland and Scottish Railway (LMS) in 1923, the station was renamed Ardrossan Montgomerie Pier on 2 June 1924. The name change was to avoid confusion with the nearby G&SWR station of the same name, which was also incorporated into the LMS. Montgomerie Pier survived the former L&AR station closures of 1932.

The station then passed on to the Scottish Region of British Railways on nationalisation in 1948, and continued to operate until it officially closed to passengers by the British Railways Board on 6 May 1968, although the last train ran on 25 September 1967. Despite track removal in 1970, the station was still intact in 1974. Today Montgomerie Pier is the site of private flats overlooking the Ardrossan Marina, and no trace of the station remains.

== Station description ==
The station consisted of two side platforms in an iron-framed wooden-clad building, and originally had a glazed roof supported on lattice girders. A booking office for boats to Belfast was situated at the pier end of the platforms.

Preceding station	Historical railways	Following station
Terminus	Caledonian Railway; Lanarkshire and Ayrshire Railway	Ardrossan North; Line and station closed
Terminus	British Railways; Montgomerie Pier Branch	Kilwinning; 1947 - 1960; Line closed, station open
