= Troon railway station (disambiguation) =

Troon railway station may refer to:

Scotland

- Troon railway station (current)
- Troon (Harbour) railway station (closed)
- Troon railway station (1839-1892) (closed)
- Troon Goods railway station (closed) in Troon, South Ayrshire

Belgium

- Trône/Troon metro station in Brussels

== See also ==
- Barassie railway station - serves Barassie, slightly north of Troon, Scotland
- Troon (disambiguation)
