= Troon Harbour railway station =

Former railway station in Scotland

Troon

General information
- Location: Troon, Ayrshire; Scotland
- Coordinates: 55.548°N 4.684°W

Other information
- Status: Disused

History
- Original company: Kilmarnock and Troon Railway

Key dates
- 6 July 1812: Opened
- 20 July 1846: Closed
Location

Troon railway station was a railway station serving the town of Troon, South Ayrshire, Scotland. Located at Troon Harbour, this was the first railway station in the town and was part of the Kilmarnock and Troon Railway.

== History ==
The station was opened on 6 July 1812. The Glasgow, Paisley, Kilmarnock and Ayr Railway took over management of the station on 16 July 1846, however the station closed just days later on 20 July 1846.

Preceding station	Historical railways	Following station
Terminus	Glasgow and South Western Railway; Kilmarnock and Troon Railway	Barassie; Line closed; station open
