= Troon (disambiguation) =

Troon is a town in South Ayrshire, Scotland.

Troon may also refer to:

- Troon, Arizona, a housing development in Arizona, United States
- Troon, Cornwall, a village in Cornwall, England
- Troon (ward), electoral division in Scotland
- Troon F.C., a Scottish football club
- Troon railway station (disambiguation), former and present railway stations
- Troon Tornadoes, a Scottish basketball club
- HMS Troon, a ship name of the British Royal Navy
- Troon (slur), a slur for transgender people

== See also ==
- Royal Troon Golf Club, Troon, Scotland, UK
- Kilmarnock and Troon Railway, Scotland, UK
