= Barassie railway station =

Railway station in South Ayrshire, Scotland

Barassie Scottish Gaelic: Bàrr Fhasaidh
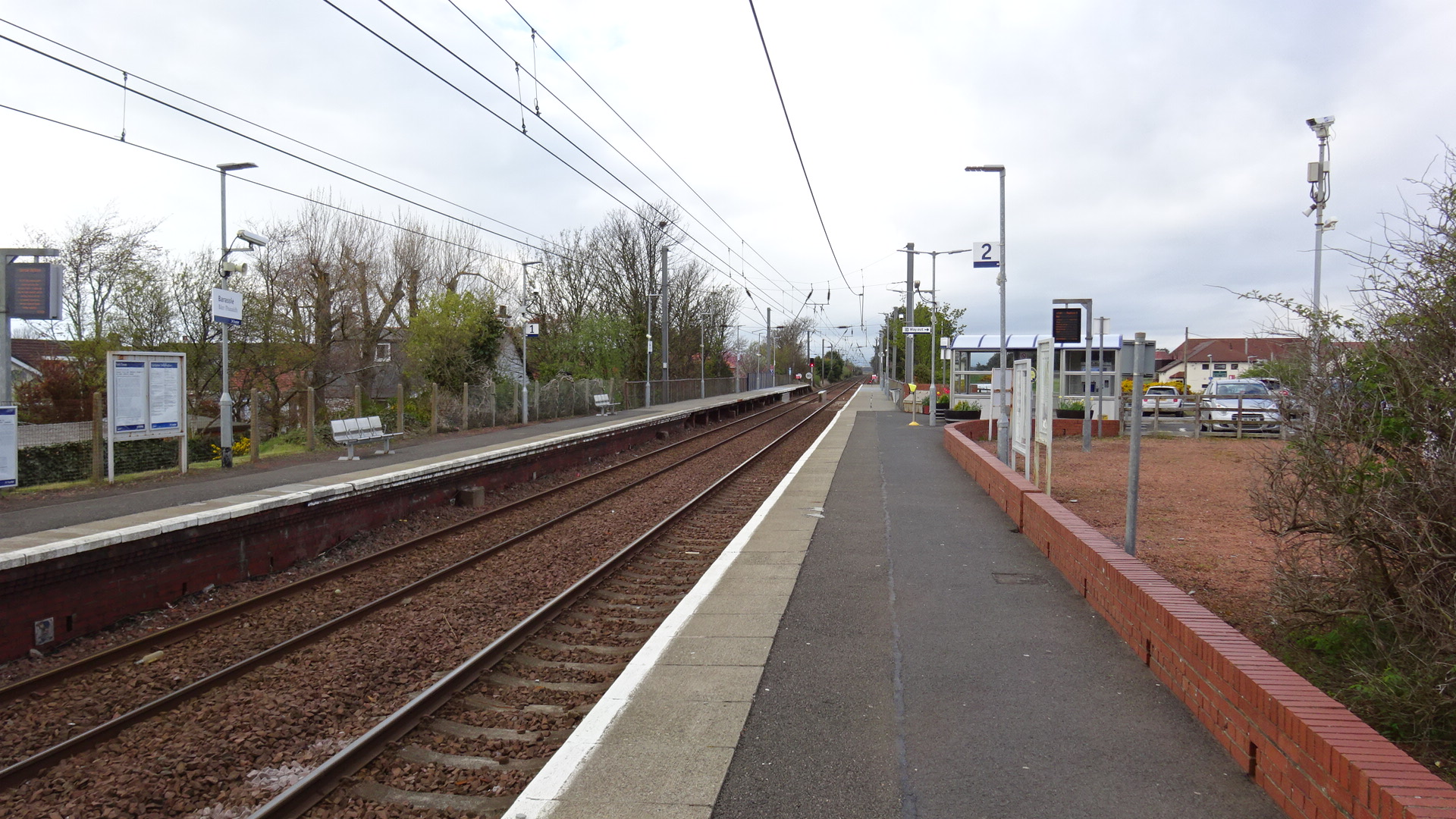
- Barassie railway station, looking north

General information
- Location: Barassie, South Ayrshire; Scotland
- Coordinates: 55.5614°N 4.6514°W
- Grid reference: NS328328
- Manager: ScotRail
- Transit authority: Strathclyde Partnership for Transport
- Platforms: 2

Other information
- Station code: BSS

Key dates
- 5 August 1839: Opened

Passengers
- 2021/22: ▲79,534
- 2022/23: ▲0.112 million
- 2023/24: ▲0.137 million
- 2024/25: ▲0.155 million
- 2024/25: ▲0.165 million
Location
Notes
- Passenger statistics from the Office of Rail and Road

Barassie railway station is a railway station serving Barassie, South Ayrshire, Scotland. The station is managed by ScotRail and is on the Ayrshire Coast Line.

== History ==
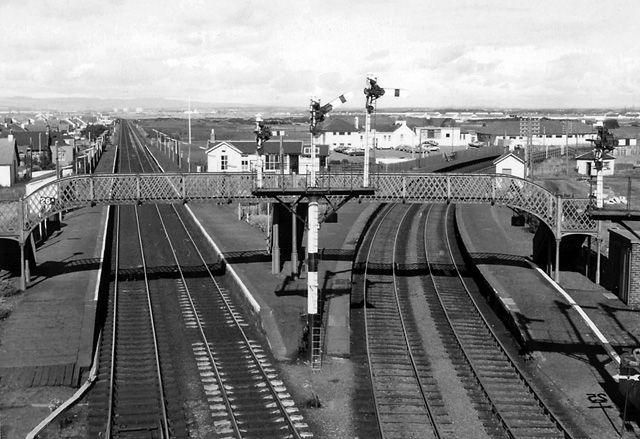
The station with four platforms in 1974

The station was originally opened on 5 August 1839 by the Glasgow, Paisley, Kilmarnock and Ayr Railway. At one point a halt existed nearby serving Barassie Workshops, however it was closed by July 1926.

Barassie station originally had four platforms, two of which were on the former Kilmarnock and Troon Railway line from Kilmarnock. These platforms went out of use after the local passenger service over the branch was withdrawn by British Rail on 3 March 1969. They are now derelict & fenced off, but the two platforms on the Ayr line are still operational today. Barassie was a staffed station until the line was electrified in 1986, but the main buildings have since been demolished and there are now only waiting shelters in use on each platform.

South of the station, there are a number of active engineers sidings that occupy the alignment of the original 1839 GPK&AR route southwards. As first built, this bypassed Troon to the east by around 1/2 mile (800 metres), leaving travellers with an inconvenient journey by coach or on foot from the town centre to the initial passenger station. It wasn't until 1892 that this problem was finally remedied by the Glasgow and South Western Railway, who opened a new deviation line and passenger station that was much better sited for the town. This line (known as the Troon Loop) is now the only one in use, as its predecessor closed to through traffic in November 1982 (though most passenger trains had been routed via the Loop line since April 1966) and was subsequently lifted at its southern end during the re-signalling & electrification work. The former K&TR line to Troon (Harbour) has also disappeared, closing to all traffic in 1973.

Passenger services over the Kilmarnock branch were subsequently reinstated in May 1975, when the twice-daily Stranraer Harbour - London Euston boat trains were diverted over the route. However the branch platforms were not reopened (as noted above) as the services concerned ran non-stop between Kilmarnock & Ayr. As a consequence of this, the current (more frequent) Kilmarnock - Ayr - Girvan DMU service cannot call here. The branch has also been singled, with control shared between the West of Scotland Signalling Centre in Glasgow (which supervises the entire Glasgow - Ayr route) and Kilmarnock PSB.

== Services (as of May 2026) ==
The current service at Barassie is as follows:

=== Monday to Saturday ===
There is a half-hourly service northbound to Glasgow Central and southbound to Ayr.

=== Sunday ===
There is an hourly service northbound to Glasgow Central and southbound to Ayr.

Preceding station	National Rail	Following station
Troon	ScotRail; Ayrshire Coast Line	Irvine
	Historical railways	
Troon (new)	Glasgow and South Western Railway; Troon Loop Line	Connection with GPK&AR
Troon (old); Line and station closed	Glasgow and South Western Railway; Glasgow, Paisley, Kilmarnock and Ayr Railway	Gailes; Line open; station closed
Troon (Harbour); Line and station closed	Glasgow and South Western Railway; Kilmarnock and Troon Railway	Drybridge; Line open; station closed
