= Troon railway station =

Railway station in South Ayrshire, Scotland

Troon Scottish Gaelic: An Truthail
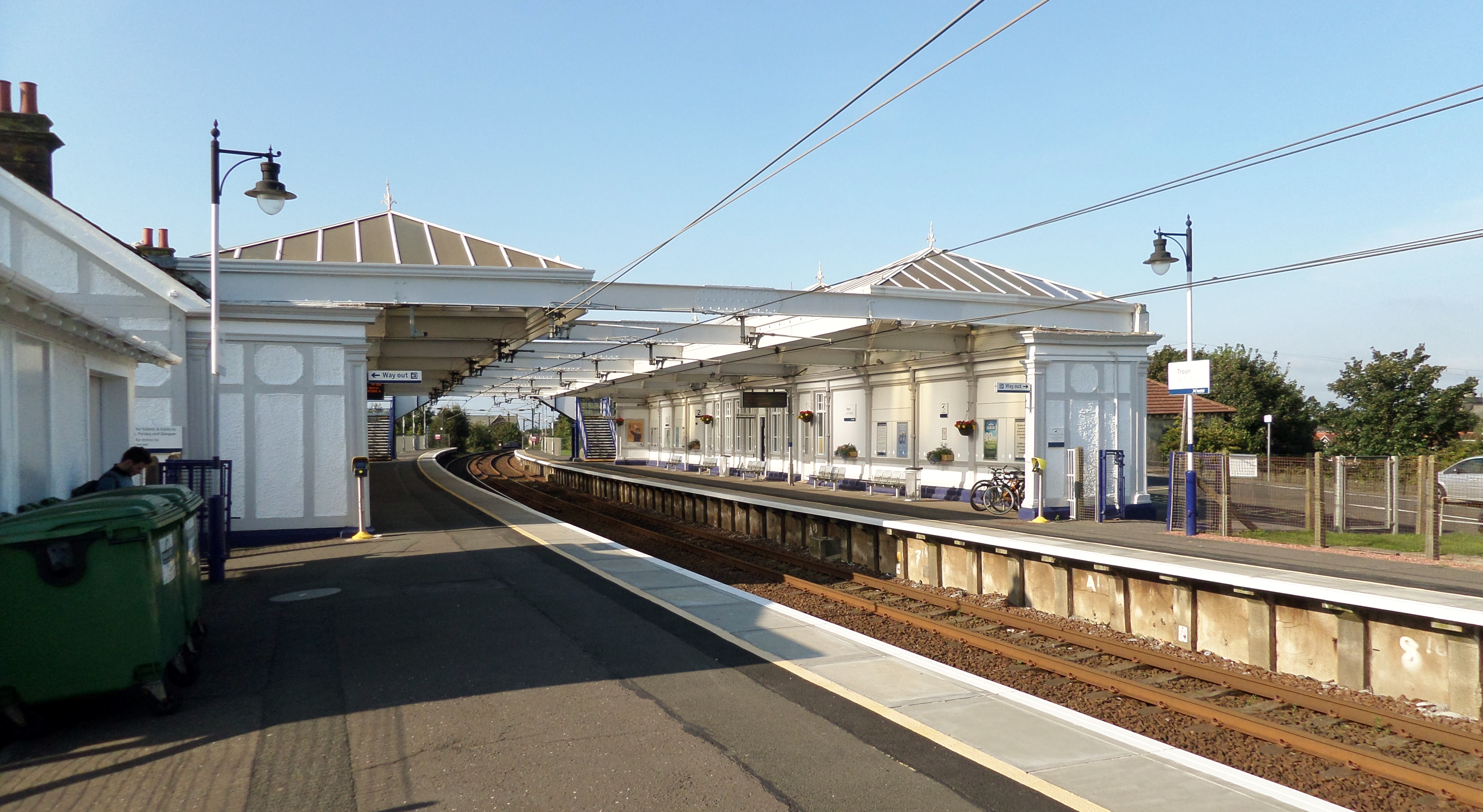

General information
- Location: Troon, South Ayrshire; Scotland
- Coordinates: 55.5426°N 4.6555°W
- Grid reference: NS325308
- Manager: ScotRail
- Transit authority: SPT
- Platforms: 2

Other information
- Station code: TRN

Key dates
- 2 May 1892: Opened

Passengers
- 2021/22: ▲0.272 million
- Interchange: ▲3,245
- 2022/23: ▲0.337 million
- Interchange: ▲3,904
- 2023/24: ▲0.371 million
- Interchange: ▲5,533
- 2024/25: ▲0.498 million
- Interchange: ▲7,100
- 2025/26: ▲0.503 million
- Interchange: ▲9,097

Listed Building – Category B
- Designated: 31 May 1984
- Reference no.: LB42157
Location
Notes
- Passenger statistics from the Office of Rail and Road

Troon railway station is a railway station serving the town of Troon, South Ayrshire, Scotland. The station is managed by ScotRail, who operate all services, and is on the Ayrshire Coast Line, between Prestwick International Airport to the south, Barassie to the north, and Kilmarnock to the north east. It is measured 1 mile 16 chains (1.9 km) from Barassie Junction, where the line to Kilmarnock diverges.

== History ==
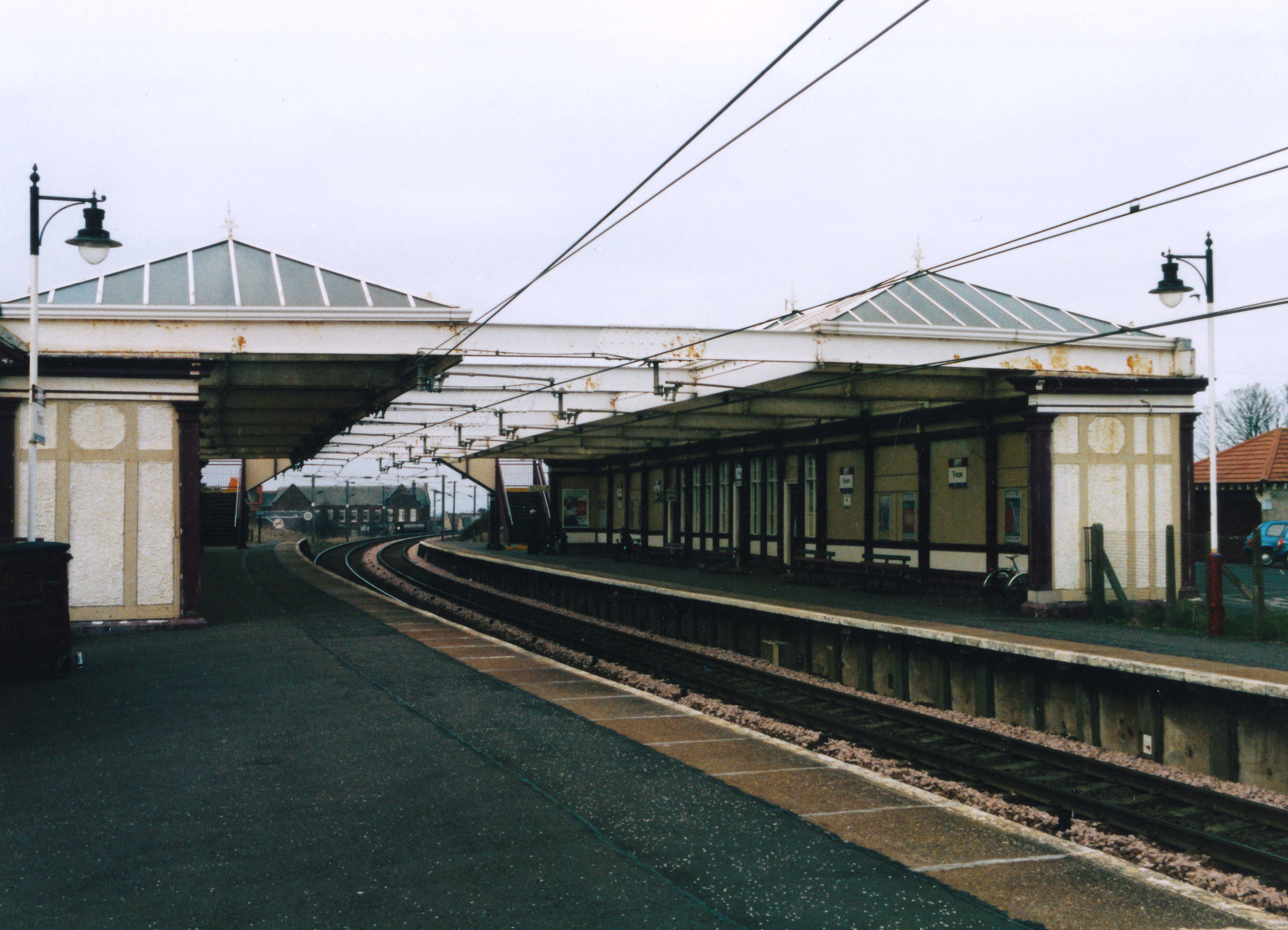
The station seen in 2002

The first station opened on 5 August 1839, and closed to passengers on 2 May 1892 upon the opening of a new station on a new loop line to the west. The original line remained open as a means of bypassing the new Troon station, and also to serve Troon Goods station which was located slightly to the north of the closed passenger station.

The new station was opened by the Glasgow and South Western Railway on the same day of the closure of the first station. The station was part of a short loop line that left the former Glasgow, Paisley, Kilmarnock and Ayr Railway just south of Barassie and rejoined the line to the north of Monkton.

Troon station consists of two side platforms with buildings designed by the architect James Miller.

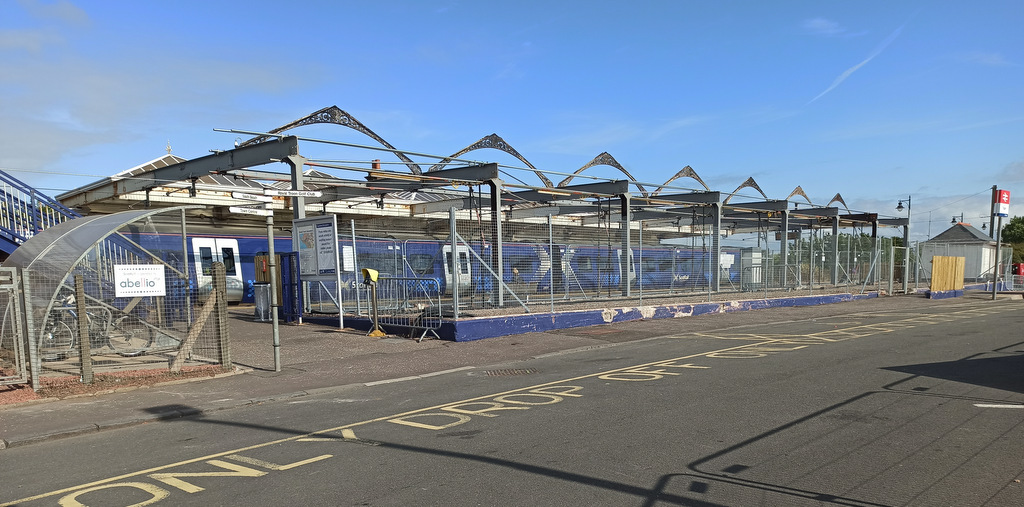
The station building in August 2021, one month after the fire

=== 2021 fire ===
On 17 July 2021, when the station was unstaffed, a fire severely damaged the station building at platform 1, including the ticket office, a hairdresser and a café. Damage to the overhead wires led to suspension of service between Kilwinning and Ayr until 23 July 2021 and suspension of service at Troon until the structures could be rendered safe. The station reopened in late July 2021.

The station was repaired and refurbished by Network Rail between October 2023 and July 2024.

== Facilities ==
The station has a car park and cycle storage, pay phones, waiting rooms, toilets, ticket machines and a ticket office, and departure screens.

== Passenger volume ==
Passenger volume at Troon
	2004–05	2005–06	2006–07	2007–08	2008–09	2009–10	2010–11	2011–12	2012–13	2013–14	2014–15	2015–16	2016–17	2017–18	2018–19	2019–20	2020–21	2021–22	2022–23	2023–24	2024–25
Entries and exits	509,318	539,180	561,803	569,318	617,904	613,848	644,720	644,836	655,828	653,312	683,102	671,310	756,400	659,962	616,184	610,086	79,790	271,606	337,142	370,634	498,042
Interchanges	3,193	3,491	3,876	4,381	5,017	4,777	4,987	7,545	5,447	5,660	6,174	9,917	8,602	8,356	7,957	7,564	1,007	3,245	3,904	5,533	7,100

The statistics cover twelve month periods that start in April.

== Services ==
On weekdays, there is a half-hourly service northbound to Glasgow Central and southbound to Ayr. On the Glasgow South Western Line, there are also nine trains per day northbound to Kilmarnock, one of which continues to Glasgow Central. Southbound, there are eight trains per day to Girvan, two of which continue to Stranraer. Passengers need to change trains at Ayr for other southbound services beyond Ayr station.

On Sundays, there is a half-hourly service northbound to Glasgow Central and southbound to Ayr.

Preceding station	National Rail	Following station
Prestwick International Airport	ScotRail; Ayrshire Coast Line	Barassie
Prestwick International Airport	ScotRail; Glasgow South Western Line	Kilmarnock
	Historical railways	
Monkton; Line open; station closed	Glasgow and South Western Railway; Troon Loop Line	Barassie; Line closed; station open

== Ferry ==
The port of Troon is located approximately 0.8 miles (1.3 km) from the railway station, a walk of around fifteen minutes. There are footpaths throughout. Since March 2024, Caledonian MacBrayne operate a ferry service to Brodick on the Isle of Arran multiple times a day, initially using the chartered catamaran MV Alfred before the introduction of their new vessel MV Glen Sannox. Bus transfers operate from the station to the ferry terminal at ferry times.

Preceding station	Ferry	Following station
Terminus	Caledonian MacBrayne; Arran Ferry	Brodick

== Bibliography ==
- Brailsford, Martyn, ed. (December 2017) [1987]. Railway Track Diagrams 1: Scotland & Isle of Man (6th ed.). Frome: Trackmaps. ISBN 978-0-9549866-9-8.
- Butt, R. V. J. (October 1995). The Directory of Railway Stations: details every public and private passenger station, halt, platform and stopping place, past and present (1st ed.). Sparkford: Patrick Stephens Ltd. ISBN 978-1-85260-508-7. OCLC 60251199. OL 11956311M.
- Hume, John R. (1976). The Industrial Archaeology of Scotland, Vol. 1: The Lowlands and Borders. London: B. T. Batsford Ltd. ISBN 0-7134-3234-9.
