= Newtonhead railway station =

Former railway station in Scotland

Newtonhead railway station was a railway station near the town of Ayr, South Ayrshire, Scotland. The station was part of the Glasgow and South Western Railway.

== History ==
It opened for passengers on 1 October 1864 and closed on 1 April 1868.

Preceding station	Historical railways	Following station
Annbank; Line and station closed	Glasgow and South Western Railway; Annbank to Monkton Branch	Monkton; Line and station closed
