= Prestwick International Airport railway station =

Railway station in South Ayrshire, Scotland

Prestwick International Airport
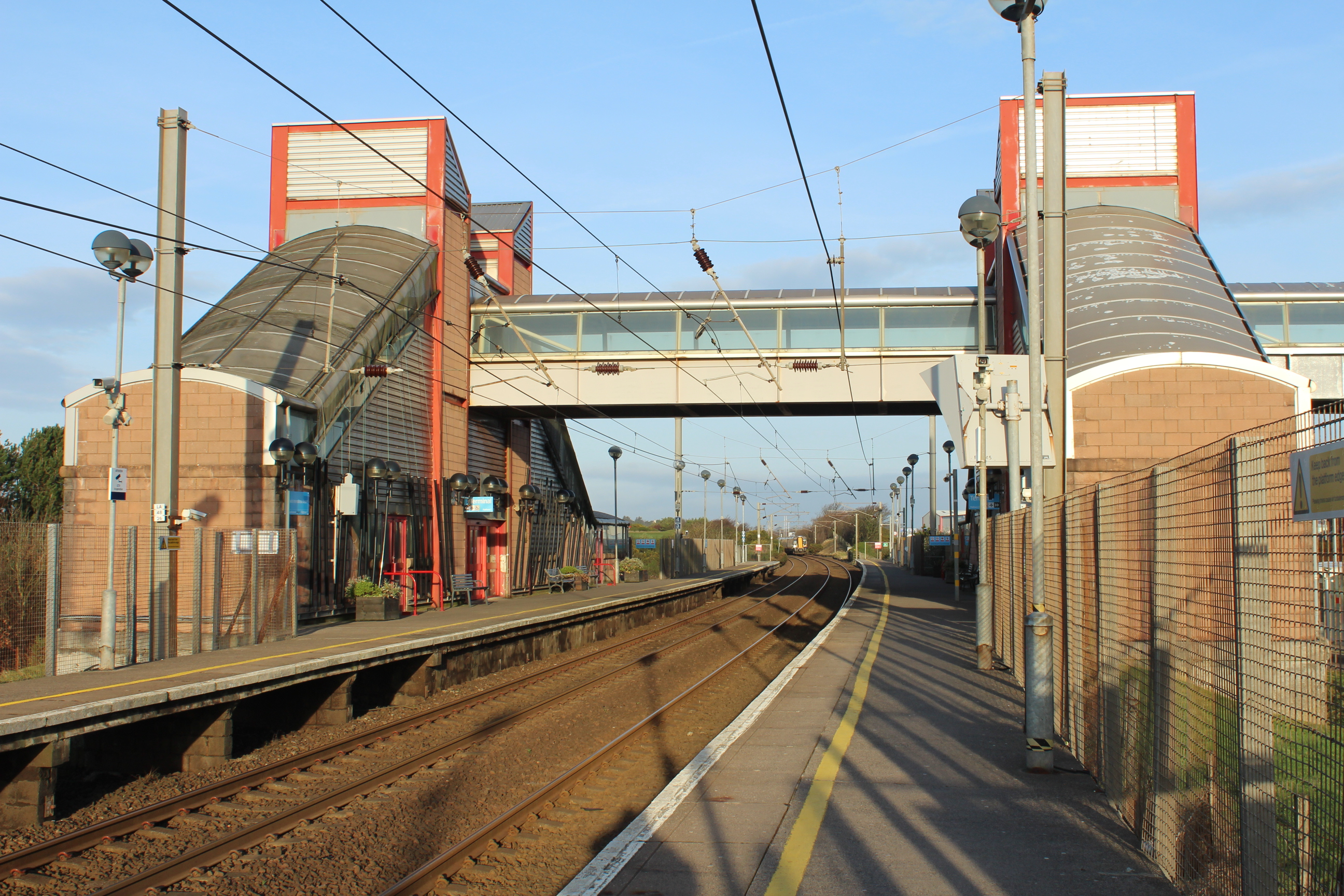
- View north towards Troon

General information
- Location: Glasgow Prestwick Airport, South Ayrshire, Scotland
- Coordinates: 55.5090°N 4.6141°W
- Grid reference: NS350270
- Manager: Glasgow Prestwick Airport
- Platforms: 2

Other information
- Station code: PRA

Key dates
- 5 September 1994: Opened

Passengers
- 2021/22: ▲26,276
- 2022/23: ▲56,980
- 2023/24: ▲78,304
- 2024/25: ▲85,954
- 2025/26: ▲0.102 million
Location
Notes
- Passenger statistics from the Office of Rail and Road

Prestwick International Airport railway station (formerly known as Glasgow Prestwick Airport station) serves Glasgow Prestwick Airport, near the town of Prestwick, South Ayrshire, Scotland. The station is 37 3/4 miles (60.8 km) south west of Glasgow Central, on the Ayrshire Coast Line.

== History ==
It opened on 5 September 1994. Prior to the opening of Inverness Airport railway station in 2023, it was the only railway station in Scotland that was directly connected to an airport. It is also the only railway station in Scotland not managed by ScotRail or Network Rail.

== Services ==
In the December 2019 timetable, on weekdays and Saturdays there were four trains per hour (two trains per hour in the evening) northbound to Glasgow and southbound to Ayr. On Sunday there were two trains per hour (one train per hour in the evening) northbound to Glasgow and southbound to Ayr. Only one train northbound from Stranraer to Kilmarnock called here in the late evening on weekdays and Saturdays.

On weekdays and Saturdays, There is a half-hourly service northbound to Glasgow Central and southbound to Ayr. On Sundays, there is a half-hourly service northbound to Glasgow Central and southbound to Ayr dropping to hourly in the late evening.

Preceding station	National Rail	Following station
Prestwick Town	ScotRail; Ayrshire Coast Line	Troon
Prestwick Town	ScotRail; Glasgow South Western Line	Troon
