= Craig yr Hafod Tramroad =

1812 horse-drawn tramroad in Wales

Overview
- Status: Defunct
- Termini: quarry on Mynydd y Garn-fawr; Monmouthshire and Brecon Canal

Service
- Type: Tramroad

Technical
- Track gauge: 2 ft 9 in (838 mm)

The Craig yr Hafod Tramroad was a 2 ft 9 in (838 mm) gauge plateway for horse-drawn trams in Monmouthshire, Wales. It connected a limestone quarry at Craig-yr-hafod high on the eastern flanks of Mynydd y Garn-fawr with the (then) Brecknock and Abergavenny Canal between Llanellen and Llanover. From the quarry, it ran north and then east around the head of the Ochram Brook/Nant Llanellen valley before heading southeast towards the canal, descending about 900 feet (270 m) in total over the course of 2 3/4 miles (4.4 km). It was operated by the Cwm Llanellen Lime and Coal Company from about 1812 though it is not known when operations ceased.

Though it ran to the canal and was constructed under the Brecknock and Abergavenny Canal Act 1793 (33 Geo. 3. c. 96) which allowed for tramroad development in association with this waterway, it does not appear to have been intended to connect with it but rather to have served limekilns which stand near to the canal, to the consternation of the Brecknock and Abergavenny Canal Company. The tramroad as a whole appears to have been lightly constructed and the lack of visible wear on extant blocks suggests its use was limited. The gauge appears to have been 2 ft 9 in (838 mm) with individual tramplates 3 feet 1 1/2 inches (952 mm) long; a curved plate in Abergavenny Museum probably originates from this tramroad.
