= Monkton railway station =

Former railway station in Scotland

Monkton
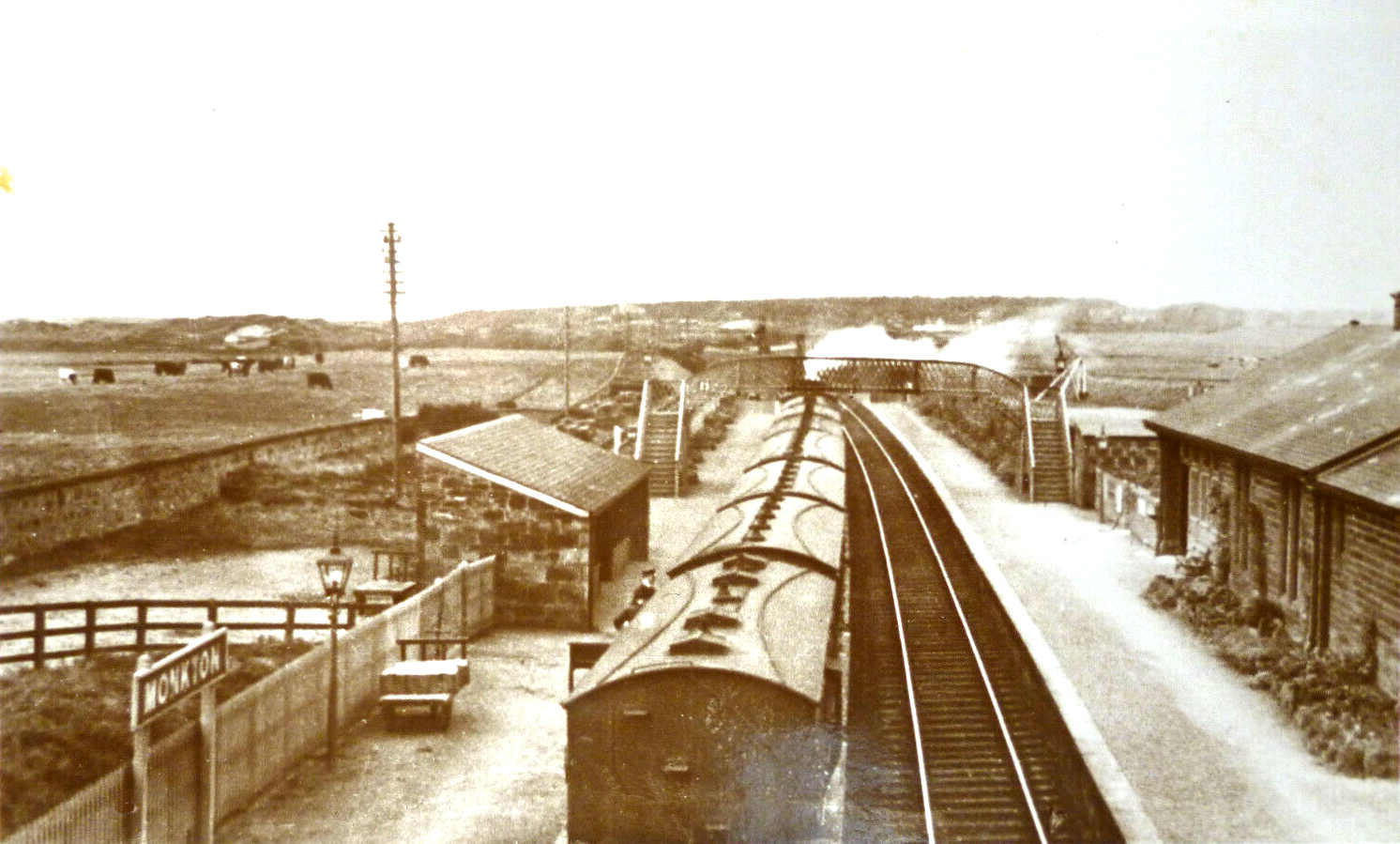
- Monkton station in 1895

General information
- Location: Monkton, Ayrshire; Scotland
- Coordinates: 55.5146°N 4.6173°W
- Grid reference: NS347276
- Platforms: 2

Other information
- Status: Disused

History
- Original company: Glasgow, Paisley, Kilmarnock and Ayr Railway
- Pre-grouping: Glasgow and South Western Railway

Key dates
- 5 August 1839: Opened
- 28 October 1940: Closed
Location

Monkton railway station was a railway station on the Glasgow to Ayr main line serving the village of Monkton, Ayrshire, Scotland. It opened in 1839. Monkton did not develop and the station was closed in 1940. The location may be identified by the overbridge that leads to Monkton House.

The site of the former station is occupied by fuel sidings used by Prestwick Airport.

== History ==
The Glasgow, Paisley, Kilmarnock and Ayr Railway opened its main line in stages. That between Irvine and an "Ayr" station (at the site of the present-day Newton-on-Ayr) was opened on 5 August 1839. Monkton station was opened on the line from the outset, although probably spelt Monckton initially. It was located about a mile north of the present-day Prestwick International station, at the place where an overbridge carries a road to Monkton House. The station served the house, and the village of Monkton, located about a mile to the east.

The station is listed in Bradshaw in the 1840s, for example in 1843, The Glasgow, Paisley, Kilmarnock and Ayr Railway combined with other companies to form the Glasgow and South Western Railway. The station was closed on 28 October 1940 by the London, Midland and Scottish Railway.

Reference to satellite images shows aviation fuel tank wagons in a siding at the former station, serving Prestwick airport.

Preceding station	Historical railways	Following station
Prestwick; Line and station open	Glasgow and South Western Railway; Troon Loop Line	Troon (new); Line and station open
Prestwick; Line and station open	Glasgow and South Western Railway; Glasgow, Paisley, Kilmarnock and Ayr Railway	Troon (old); Line and station closed
Newtonhead; Line and station closed	Glasgow and South Western Railway; Monkton and Annbank Branch	Connection with GPK&AR
