= Gailes railway station =

Former railway station in Scotland

Gailes
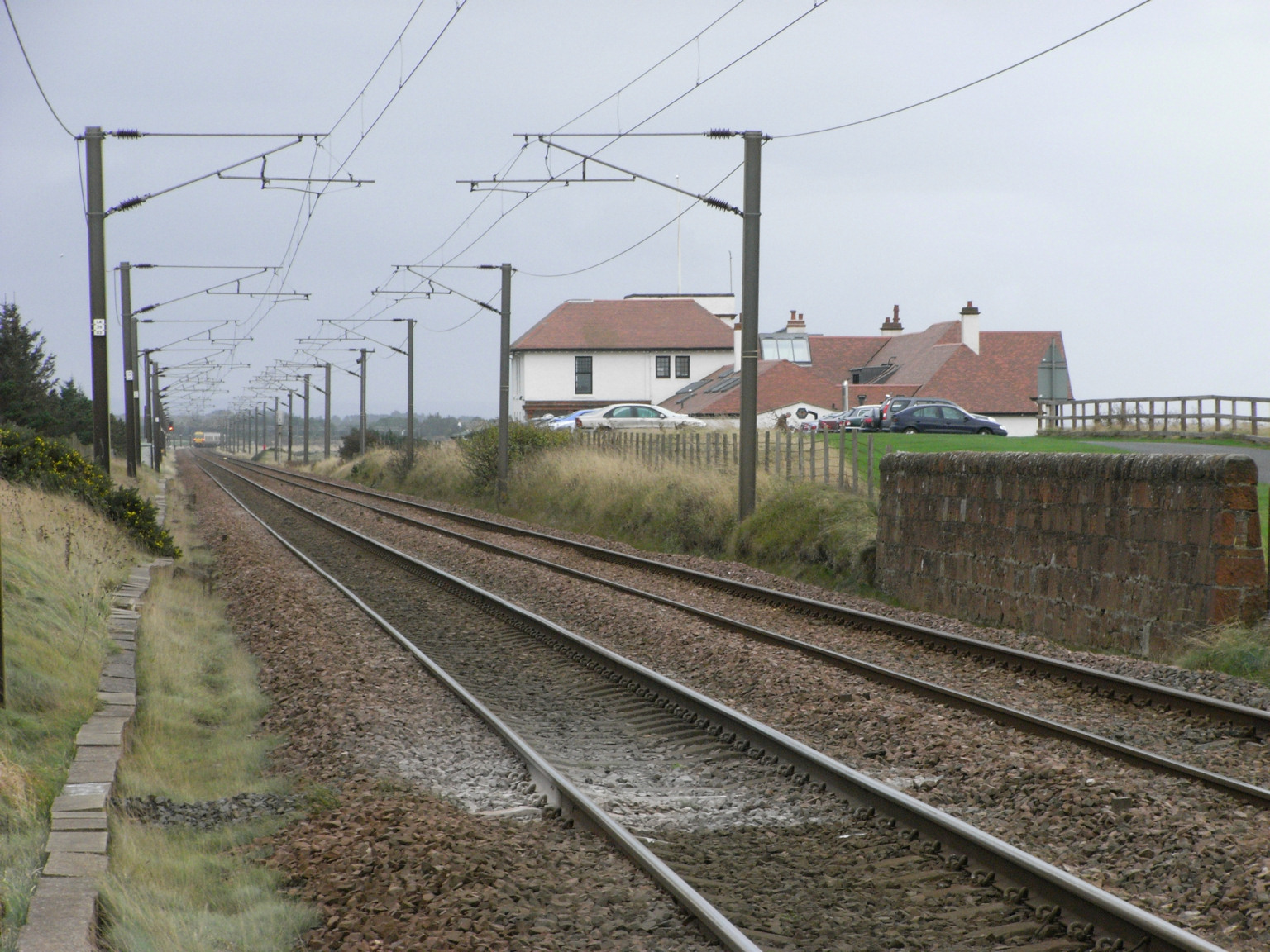
- Site of Gailes in 2007

General information
- Location: Irvine, Ayrshire; Scotland
- Coordinates: 55.5847°N 4.6626°W
- Grid reference: NS321355
- Platforms: 2

Other information
- Status: Disused

History
- Original company: Glasgow, Paisley, Kilmarnock and Ayr Railway
- Pre-grouping: Glasgow and South Western Railway
- Post-grouping: London, Midland and Scottish Railway

Key dates
- 5 August 1839: Opened
- 2 January 1967: Closed
Location

Gailes railway station was a railway station approximately two miles south of the town of Irvine, North Ayrshire, Scotland. The station was originally part of the Glasgow, Paisley, Kilmarnock and Ayr Railway (now the Ayrshire Coast Line).

== History ==
The station opened on 5 August 1839, and closed permanently on 2 January 1967.

== Accidents ==
On 23 February 2007, a Ford Transit van was hit by a southbound commuter train on the level crossing at the site of the former Gailes station. The driver of the van was killed.

Preceding station	Historical railways	Following station
Barassie; Line and station open	Glasgow and South Western Railway; Glasgow, Paisley, Kilmarnock and Ayr Railway	Irvine; Line and station open
