= Barassie =

Coordinates: 55.5613°N 4.6461°W

Barassie: Scottish Gaelic: Bàrr Fhasaidh
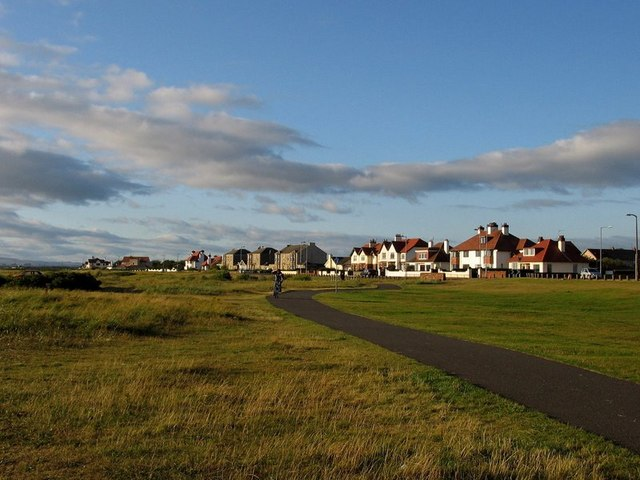
- Barassie Front

- Location within South Ayrshire
- OS grid reference: NS332329
- Council area: South Ayrshire
- Lieutenancy area: Ayrshire and Arran
- Country: Scotland
- Sovereign state: United Kingdom
- Post town: TROON
- Postcode district: KA10
- Dialling code: 01292
- UK Parliament: Central Ayrshire
- Scottish Parliament: Ayr

Barassie (Scottish Gaelic: Bàrr Fhasaidh) is a former village on the east shore of the Firth of Clyde in South Ayrshire, Scotland. Today it serves as a suburb outside the northern edge of Troon.

To the north-east of Barassie is the Kilmarnock Barassie Golf Club, which is where Gordon Sherry played. Barassie railway station is situated on the Ayrshire Coast Line, and there are regular rail services from the station to Ayr and Glasgow on a daily basis.

Barassie is a diverse area consisting of a mixture of affluent middle class suburbs to the north and some social housing to the south.

== History ==
Archeological site investigations have identified Neolithic and Bronze Age remains.

In the mid 19th century the village developed from a farm and mill and became a centre of railway wagon maintenance.
