= Plateway =

Early kind of flanged cast-iron railway

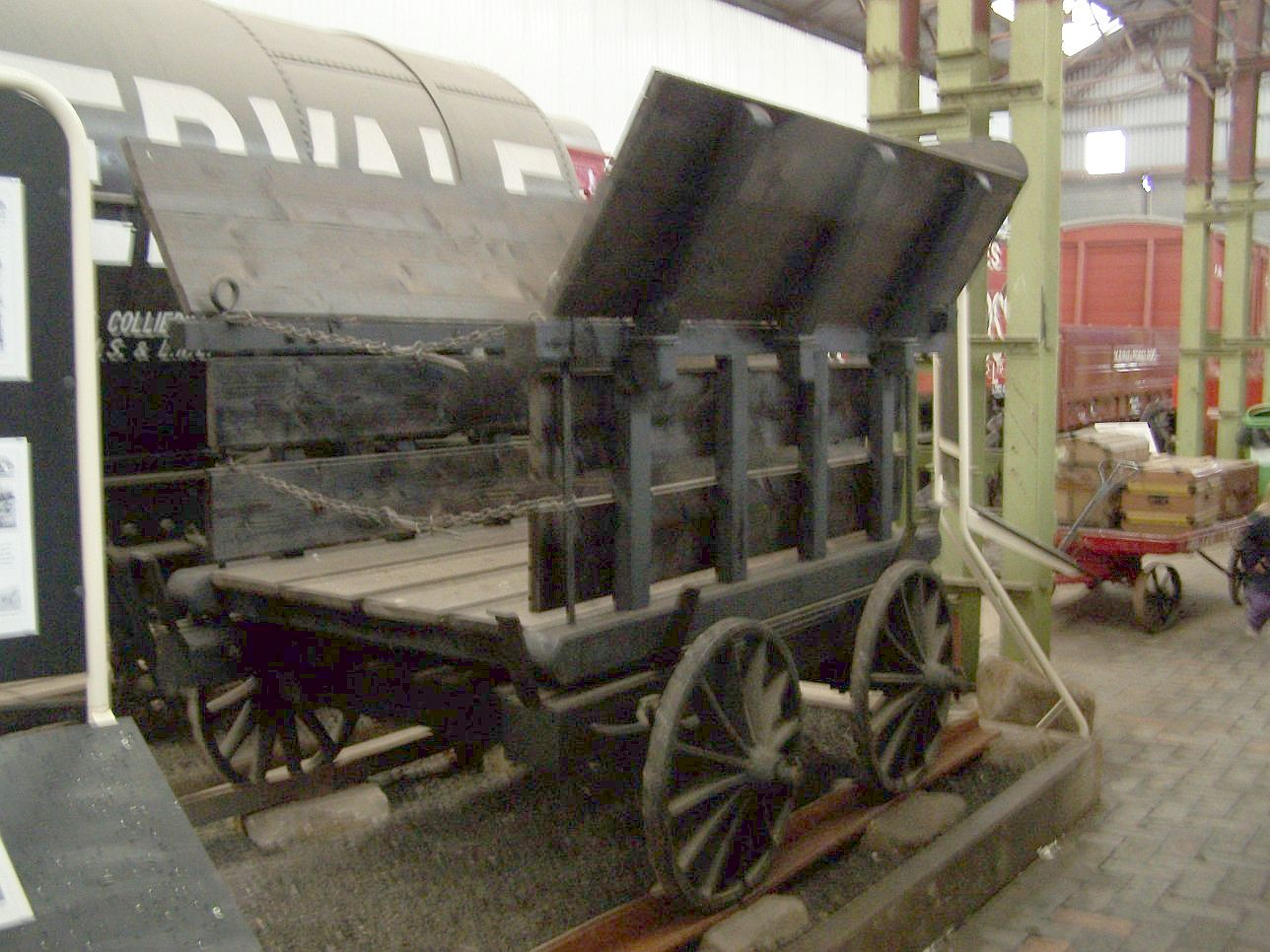
A replica of a "Little Eaton Tramway" wagon. The rails have an 'L' cross-section and the wheels have no flange.

A plateway is an early kind of railway, tramway or wagonway, where the rails are made from cast iron. They were mainly used for about 50 years up to 1830, though some continued later.

Plateways consisted of L-shaped rails, where the flange on the rail guides the wheels, in contrast to edgeways, where flanges on the wheels guide them onto the track.

Plateways were originally horse-drawn but, later on, cable haulage and small locomotives were sometimes used.

The plates of the plateway were made of cast iron, often fabricated by the ironworks that were their users. On most lines, that system was replaced by rolled wrought iron (and later steel) "edge rails" which, along with realignment to increase the radius of curves, converted them into modern railways, better suited to locomotive operation.

Plateways were particularly favoured in South Wales and the Forest of Dean, in some cases replacing existing edge rails. Other notable plateways included the Hay Railway, the Gloucester and Cheltenham Railway, the Surrey Iron Railway, the Derby Canal Railway, the Kilmarnock and Troon Railway, the Portreath Tramroad in Cornwall, and lines at Coalbrookdale, Shropshire.

== Plates and rails ==
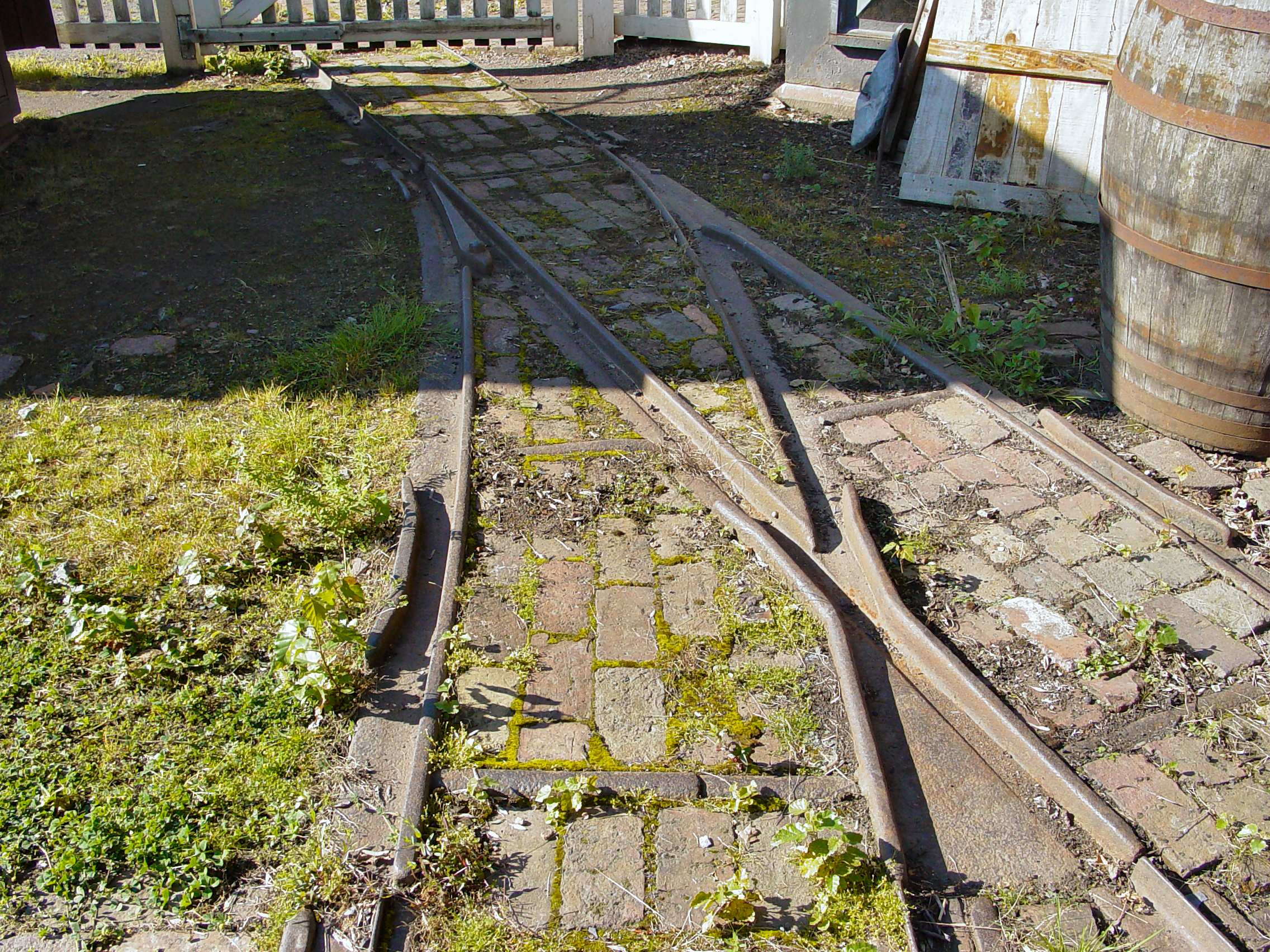
A reconstructed section of flangeway track as used by Richard Trevithick's pioneering locomotives at Coalbrookdale and Merthyr

The plates of a plateway generally rested on stone blocks or sleepers, which served to spread the load over the ground, and to maintain the gauge (the distance between the rails or plates). The plates were usually made from cast iron and had differing cross sections, depending on the manufacturer. They were often very short, typically about 3 feet (0.9 m) long, able to stretch only from one block to the next.

The L-section plateway was introduced for underground use in about 1787, by John Curr of Sheffield Park Colliery. Joseph Butler, of Wingerworth near Chesterfield, constructed a line using similarly flanged plates in 1788. A leading advocate of plate rails was Benjamin Outram, whose first line was from quarries at Crich to Bullbridge Wharf on the Cromford Canal. The early plates were prone to break, so different cross sections were employed, such as one with a second flange underneath. Some lines later introduced chairs to support the plates on the blocks, and wrought iron plates, increasing the length to 6 feet (1.8 m) and, later, 9 feet (2.7 m), spanning several sleeper blocks

In 1789, on a line between Nanpantan and Loughborough, Leicestershire, William Jessop used edge rails cast in 3-foot (0.9 m) lengths, with "fish-bellying" to give greater strength along the length of the rail. However, after he became a partner in Benjamin Outram and Company (Butterley Iron Works) he designed the Surrey Iron Railway and the Kilmarnock and Troon Railway as plateways, though between these (in 1803) he designed the Ruabon Brook Tramway as using edge-rail.

=== Combined plate and rail ===
An alternative design, with the flange on the outside designed to be additionally used with flanged wheels, was unsuccessfully trialled on the Monmouthshire Canal Company's line shortly before its reconstruction as a modern railway. That idea was taken up in 1861 by the Toronto streetcar system. Horsecars ran on the upper, outer part as edgerail, with the wheel flanges on the inside. The edge rail formed an outside flange for a broad foot which allowed wagons to pass through the unmade streets. That combination necessitated a unique, broader gauge of 4 ft 10 7/8 in (1,495 mm) known as the Toronto gauge.

== Operations ==
The early plateways were usually operated on a toll basis, with any rolling stock owner able to operate their wagons on the tracks. Sometimes, the plateway company was forbidden to operate its own wagons, so as to prevent a monopoly situation arising.

Some plateways, such as the Gloucester and Cheltenham Railway, were single-track, with passing loops at frequent intervals. The single-track sections were arranged so that wagon drivers could see from one loop to the next, and wait for oncoming traffic if necessary. However, others, such as the Surrey Iron Railway, the Kilmarnock and Troon Railway, the Monmouthshire Railway and Canal Company tramroads, and the Severn and Wye Railway, were wholly or partly double-track.

== Advantages and disadvantages ==
Because they had un-flanged wheels, wagons that ran on plateways could also run on ordinary roads. Plateways tended to get obstructed by loose stones and grit, leading to wear. Edgeways avoid the stone obstruction problem.

Stone blocks had an advantage over timber sleepers because they left the middle of the track unhindered for the hooves of horses, but timber sleepers had an advantage over stone blocks because they prevented the track from spreading. The gauges of some tramroads increased by a couple of inches after decades of horses passing up the middle but, being loose on the axles, the wheels could usually be adjusted slightly with washers.

Level crossings could be made truly level, the carts being re-engaged with the flanges once across the roadway.

== Antecedents ==
Even older than plateways were wagonways, which used wooden rails. Despite its ancient appearance, the Haytor Granite Tramway, the track with ledges cut in stone blocks to produce a similar effect as tram plates, was contemporary with plateways, being built in 1820.

== See also ==
- Kerb-guided Buses
- Mine railway
- Rail tracks
- Railway
- Tramway (industrial)
- Tramway track
- Wagonway
- Craig yr Hafod Tramroad – 1812 horse-drawn tramroad in Wales
