= Kilmarnock and Troon Railway =

Railway in East Ayrshire, Scotland

Overview
- Locale: Scotland
- Dates of operation: 6 July 1812–16 July 1899
- Successor: Glasgow and South Western Railway

Technical
- Track gauge: 4 ft 8 1/2 in (1,435 mm)
- Previous gauge: 4 ft (1,219 mm) & 3 ft 4 in (1,016 mm)

The Kilmarnock and Troon Railway (K&TR) was an early railway line in Ayrshire, Scotland. It was constructed to bring coal from pits around Kilmarnock to coastal shipping at Troon Harbour, and passengers were carried.

It opened in 1812, and was the first railway in Scotland to obtain an authorising act of Parliament; it would soon also become the first railway in Scotland to use a steam locomotive; the first to carry passengers; and the River Irvine bridge, Laigh Milton Viaduct, is the earliest railway viaduct in Scotland. It was a plateway, using L-shaped iron plates as rails, to carry wagons with flangeless wheels.

In 1841, when more modern railways had developed throughout the West of Scotland, the line was converted from a plateway to a railway and realigned in places. The line became part of the Glasgow and South Western Railway system. Much of the original route is part of the present-day Kilmarnock to Barassie railway line, although the extremities of the original line have been lost.

== Origins ==
By the early years of the 19th century, William Henry Cavendish Bentinck, Marquess of Titchfield had acquired extensive lands and other properties in Ayrshire and elsewhere. When his father died in 1809, he became the 4th Duke of Portland. He owned coal workings at Kilmarnock, and in these early years transport of minerals to market required the use of coastal shipping; Ireland was an important destination.

Already in 1790, about 40% of the 8,000 tons annual production went by horse and cart to the sea at Irvine. Kilmarnock is about 10 mi (16 km) from the sea, and about 1806 he started to make a harbour at The Troon (currently referred to as just Troon). He had earlier considered a canal connection to there from Kilmarnock, but had changed his intention to a railway. He approached other landowners in the district to obtain their consent, and participation, in making a railway connection between Kilmarnock and the harbour, saying, "The plan to which I allude is for the purpose of making an iron rail road or railway from the Troon Point to Kilmarnock."

These approaches were successful in obtaining the landowners' consent, although very little financial commitment:

- The Marquess of Titchfield (i.e. Bentinck himself): 67 shares
- Lady Harriet Margaret Bentinck (his daughter): 10 shares
- Lord Montgomerie: 1 share
- The Earl of Eglinton: 1 share
- Colonel John Boyle of Shewalton: 1 share

The total subscribed capital was £38,500.

Bentinck appointed William Jessop as the engineer for the construction of the line; he had been engineer on the Surrey Iron Railway and the Croydon and Merstham railway

Early railways and tramways simply serving pits and running only over the land of the pit owner did not require special authority; in this case the new line would cross the land of other proprietors and through the Burgh of Troon and cross the turnpike road. Bentinck evidently thought it prudent to get the authorisation of an act of Parliament for his line; this may be due to the lukewarm support of his neighbours, and the earlier outright opposition of Colonel Fullarton of Crosbie Castle; Fullarton had died in 1808.

Kilmarnock and Troon Railway Act 1808
- Act of Parliament
- Parliament of the United Kingdom
- Long title: An Act for making a Railway from or near to the Town of Kilmarnock, in the County of Ayr, to a Place called The Troon, in the said County.
- Citation: 48 Geo. 3. c. xlvi

Dates
- Royal assent: 27 May 1808

Text of statute as originally enacted

Bentinck got his act on 27 May 1808, when the Kilmarnock and Troon Railway was incorporated by the Kilmarnock and Troon Railway Act 1808 (48 Geo. 3. c. xlvi). The line thus became the first railway in Scotland to be authorised by an act of Parliament. On the same day he got his act for improving Troon Harbour, the Troon Harbour Act 1808 (48 Geo. 3. c. xlvii).

== Construction ==
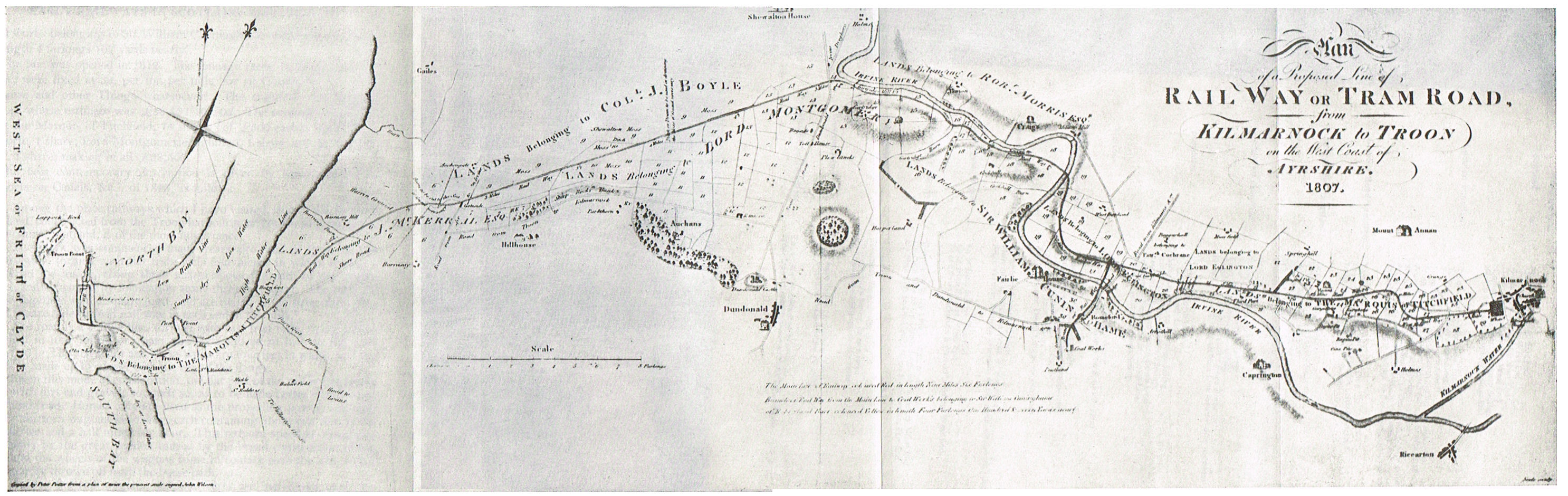
Design for the route, 1807

Jessop's estimate for the construction of the line was £38,167 10s 0d. With the exception of Laigh Milton Viaduct at Gatehead, and soft ground at Shewalton Moss, the engineering works on the line were light.

The line was engineered "as a plateway at a time when other Scottish lines were using the edge rail".

The choice of the older technology may be due to the employment of William Jessop as engineer. He had built the Surrey Iron Railway, also a plateway. The wrought iron rails were L-shaped, and the upstand guided the wagons; the wagon wheels did not have flanges, which enabled them to be easily moved around terminal areas where there was hard standing, and to and from locations further from the railway. The plates were three feet long, with a four-inch width and a three-inch upstand (920 mm long by 100 mm by 76 mm). Highet says, "These plates or rails were joined with a square joint and were nailed to the foundation stones through small square holes formed half-way in each end of the rail." Clearly the plates were carried on sleeper blocks; the "nails" refers to pins fastened into timber plugs in holes drilled in the stone blocks. The gauge of the line (i.e. the dimension over the upstands) was 4 ft (1,219 mm). The route was nine miles six furlongs (15.7 km) in length.

Carter describes the line as "Laid with a wooden plateway, ... its wooden rails were replaced with iron ones in 1815", but this seems to diverge from other accounts.

In January 1812, the Scots Magazine described the line, then not quite finished; it would be double track with frequent crossovers:

The road is to be double, or two distinct roads of four feet in width each, and laid four feet distance from each other, with frequent communications from the one road to the other, so as not only to admit of carriages going both ways, but to allow one carriage to pass another when both are travelling in one direction.

It would have a gentle gradient of about 1 in 660 (0.15%) falling towards Troon:

The total rise of the ground, from the Troon Harbour to Kilmarnock, is 80 or 84 feet, which is equally divided over the whole course of the road, so as to form it into an inclined plane, having a declivity of nearly eight feet, every mile.

The track is described in more detail:

The iron rails are 3 feet in length, and 40 lbs in weight each. Their horizontal base, on which the carriage wheels run, is 4 inches in breadth, and the ledge or parapet, rising perpendicular in the inner side of the rail, is also about 4 inches in height, raised in the centre, and declining at both ends of each rail, to add to its strength. [The rails] are not laid on sleepers of wood; but on solid blocks of stone, from 9 to 12 inches in thickness, and generally more than a foot square (in base and surface). The ground, on which these blocks are laid, is beat solid, and the stones are also beat down, after being laid, so as to give them all the solidity possible. The iron rails are bedded level on the blocks, and a hole about an inch and a quarter diameter, in the centre of each, six inches deep, is filled with a plug of oak; and a square niche being formed in the centre, at both ends of each of the rails, about half an inch above, and something narrower below, and when the ends of two of these rails are put together, the niches in each of the two rails, form one hole about an inch in length, and more than half an inch in breadth, contracting a little below; and these being placed over the plug of wood, in the centre of the block of stone, a nail is fixed into it, the head of which exactly fills up the holes in the ends of the two rails, and the holes and heads of the nails, being broader above than below, they keep the rails solid and firm on their beds. The space of four feet between the rails is filled with road metal for the horse, to near the top of the ledges of the rails, and the outside to the sole of the rails.

The majority of the rails for constructing the line were made by the Glenbuck Iron Company; by 1813 they had been paid £13,345 for about 72,000 rails; this was about a third of the entire engineering cost of building the line.

== Opening and operation ==
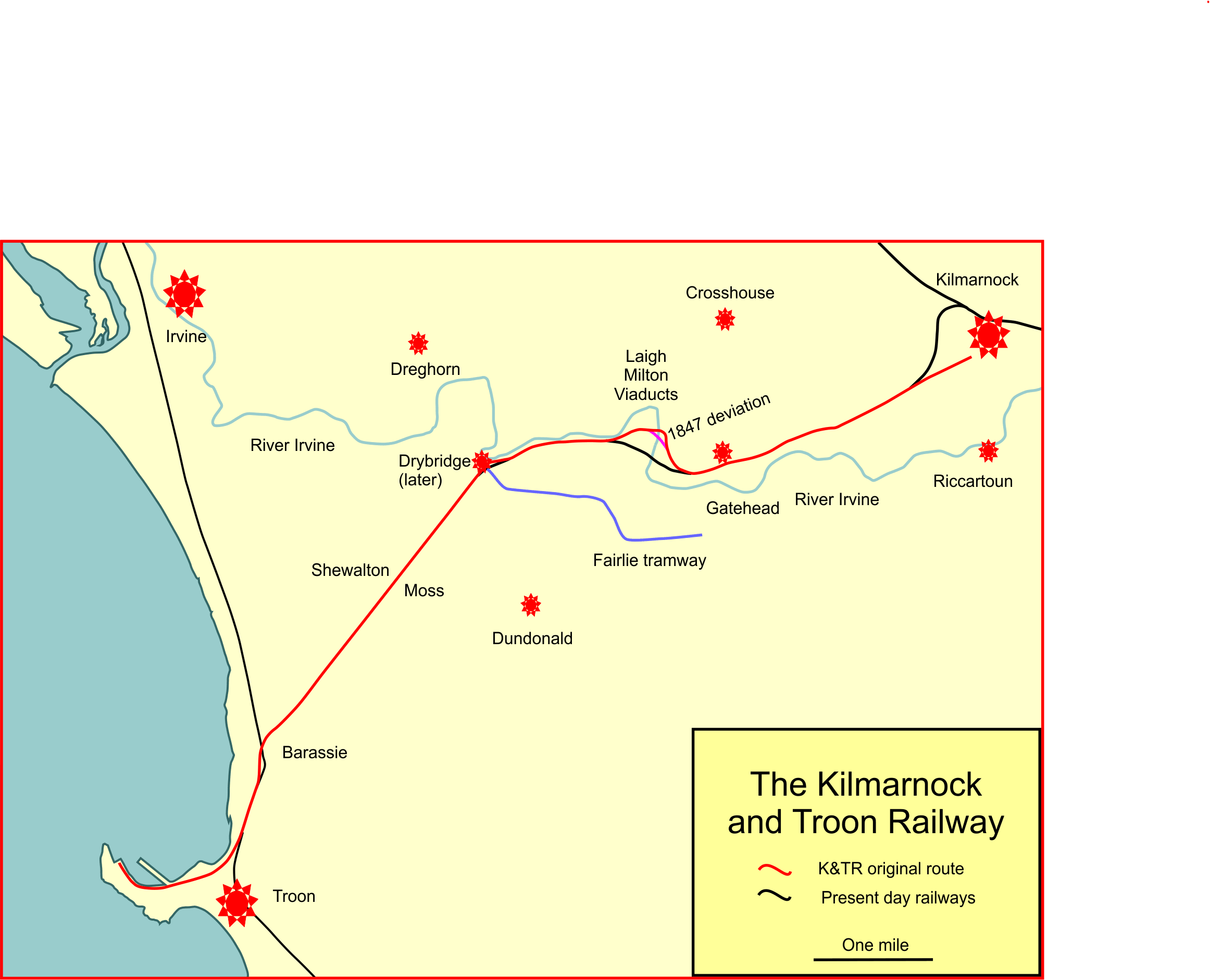
Kilmarnock and Troon Railway route

The line was opened on 6 July 1812. The construction process had taken four years, and cost £59,849, a 52% overspend.

The line operated as a toll road, so that independent carriers could place wagons on it, and pay for the facility. If a horse and cart could travel on it, so could the proprietors' cattle: "No person [shall] be allowed to drive cattle along the Railway ... excepting the proprietors, the members of the Committee of management, and the officers of the Company."

The American observer Strickland, writing in 1826, noted an obvious problem of a horse plateway:

The attendant and horse paths are four feet in width, and are raised or made up to a level with the top of the flange. From this mode of construction, the flat part of the rail is frequently filled with dirt and gravel; so much so, as to be little better than a common hard road. Horses only are used as the propelling power, and they convey thirteen wagons in convoy, each containing about one ton, at the rate of two and a half miles per hour. This reduced speed is occasioned principally by the great friction caused by the broad construction of the rails, and the wheels of the wagons come in contact, which is constantly thrown off from the horse path. Besides the rail wagons, common carts are introduced upon the rails; which has a very injurious effect, arising from the roughness of the tire of their wheels, and from the soil which adheres to them being deposited on the flat part of the rails.

Notwithstanding any shortcomings, the railway paid a dividend of 5% in 1817, and paid the same or better every year except 1858 and 1859 for the rest of the century. The company was bought out by the Glasgow and South Western Railway in 1899.

The Edinburgh Encyclopædia said, in 1832,

The only public railway of extent in Scotland, is that between the manufacturing town of Kilmarnock and the harbour of Troon; which, agreeably to act of Parliament, is open to all on payment of a certain toll.

== Laigh Milton Viaduct ==
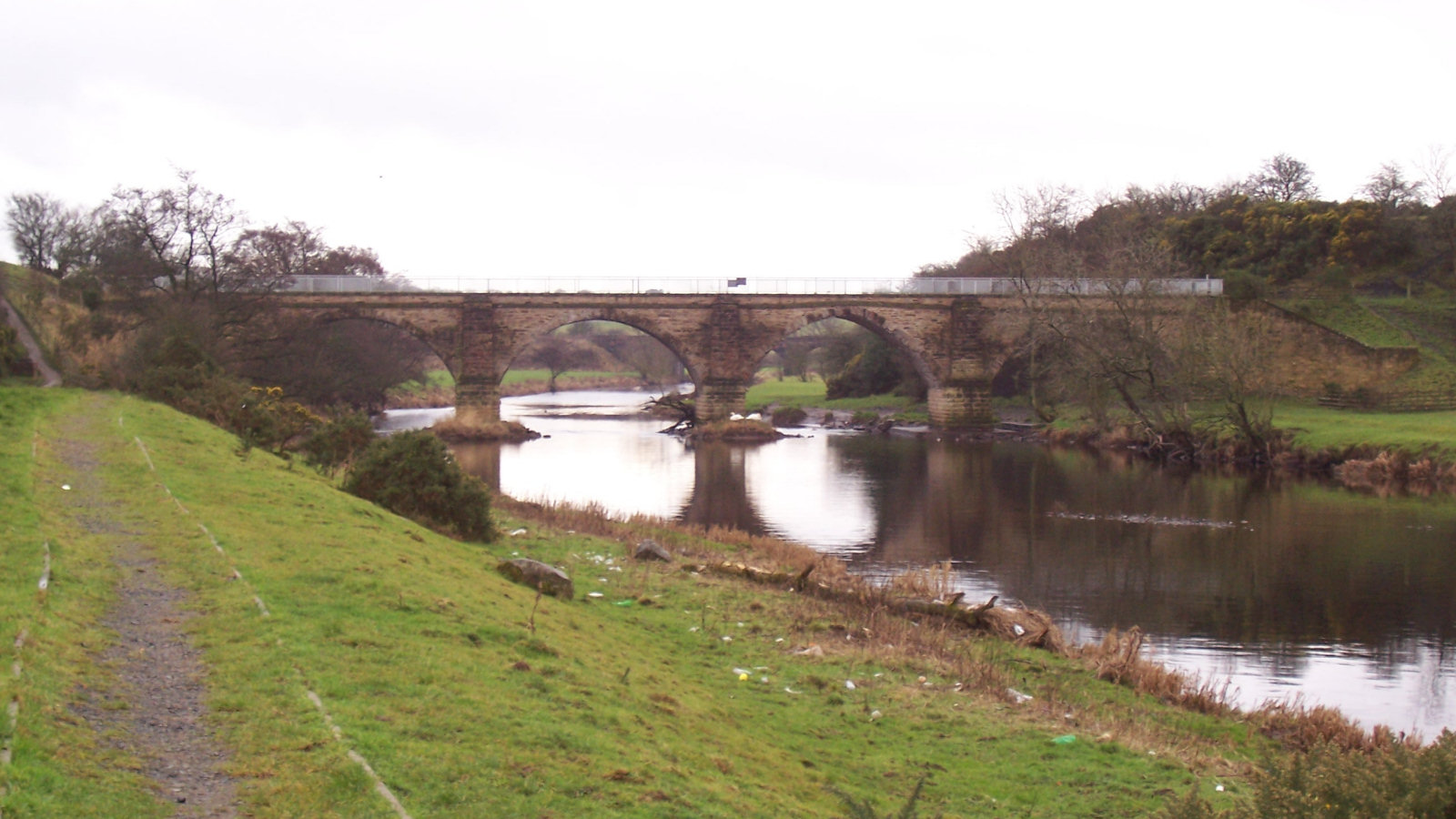
Laigh Milton viaduct in 2006

The only significant structure on the line was Laigh Milton viaduct over the river Irvine near Gatehead. This was described as a fine stone bridge of four arches, of 40 feet span and rising 25 feet above the water.

When full locomotive operation was being implemented, it was replaced by a wooden bridge a little to the south, in order to ease the curve on the eastern approach. This bridge was in turn replaced in 1865 by the present structure, taking the railway still further south to ease the alignment.)

== Passengers ==
Passenger traffic had not been contemplated when the line was conceived, and as a toll railway, it was not for the railway company to introduce them. However, William Wright of Kilmarnock operated an irregular passenger service. He paid the railway company a toll based on tonnage of passengers; this practice continued up to 1839.

Paxton says that "Passengers were travelling over the viaduct (Laigh Milton Viaduct) by August 1811." This was before the full opening of the line; it is possible that passengers were travelling over the viaduct to cross the River Irvine, as there was no ordinary bridge nearby.

The Glasgow Herald reported:

A melancholy accident happened six miles from Kilmarnock on Saturday last; [24 August 1811] the waggon was returning with a number of people from the Troon by the railway when harnessing gave way and owing to the darkness of the night, the waggon tumbled down a precipice of seven or eight feet perpendicular. One man unfortunately was killed and some so severely hurt that their lives are despaired of.

— Glasgow Herald, 30 August 1811

The Locomotive Magazine for 14 April 1906, reported that "passengers were conveyed shortly after the opening of the line (fare 1s single) in two vehicles, one, Willie Wight's Caledonia, and the other, an open carriage called The Boat". Paxton shows an image of a coach, Fair Trader, credited to East Ayrshire Libraries.

Baron Charles Dupin made a tour in Great Britain; Dendy Marshall thought that Dupin saw passenger vehicles ("I saw some diligences"), but the text is ambiguous:

A horse easily pulls five tons in going from Kilmarnock to Troon, and climbs back with empty wagons, traversing a gradient of 1 in 576. The diligence (Note: Diligence = "Closed horse-drawn four-wheeled carriage, for the purpose of conveying travellers" (Le petit Larousse, 2000)) which makes this journey on the grooved track, has four iron wheels. It is like an elongated gypsy caravan; I think it could be made longer and, full of passengers, and still pulled by a single horse. (Note: Un cheval tire aisément cinq tonneaux en allant de Kilmarnock à Troon, et remonte avec les chariots vides, en cheminant sur une pente d'un 576°. La diligence qui fait ce voyage, sur la route-ornière, a ses quatre roues en fer; elle est allongée comme une voiture nomade; elle pourrait, je le crois, être aussi grande, pleine de voyageurs, et néanmoins trainée avec facilité, par un seul cheval.)

Robertson concludes that "The Kilmarnock and Troon demonstrated that the provision of a passenger service met a demand. The horizons of Scottish promoters were widening."

The passenger service operated at first with just trucks filled with straw for passengers, but later two proper carriages, Caledonia and The Boat, both built in Dundonald, were purchased, the journey costing a shilling. Horses were changed at a stable at Gateside.

A regular passenger service was started by 'Caledonia' coach began on 1 May 1813.

Local newspapers carried an advertisement that The Caledonia would carry passengers and goods from Kilmarnock to Troon upon the Iron Railway, starting on Saturday the 27th of June, from Gargieston, "until the road is forwarded to Kilmarnock", (i.e. the line was not completed) "and every Tuesday, Thursday and Saturday, afterwards at quarter past nine in the morning; and will leave Troon at six o’clock the same evening". Tickets were to cost one shilling and goods would be "handed" from Kilmarnock to Gargieston by a local road carrier. The operator was William Paterson, and "W.P. will also accommodate any Family (who find it inconvenient on the aforesaid days) on any other day of the week." Paterson advertised a resumption of the service the next Spring; the "inside" fare was 2s 6d; evidently the Caledonia was made on the same lines as a stagecoach.

The journey took something in the region of two hours. Additional single passenger vehicles were used in later years, the term "Caledonia" becoming a local generic word for a passenger coach on the line. It is said that when the Royal Troon Golf Club was founded in 1878, the body of a "Caledonia" was used as the first changing room.

Paxton says that "The amount of passenger usage in 1837-8 can be gleaned from the £88 14s 5d paid in tonnage dues which aggregates to approximately 200,000 passenger miles travelled in 12 months. this travel probably represented two or three return trips per day between termini, increasing to four or five trips daily in summer."

== The first locomotive in Scotland ==
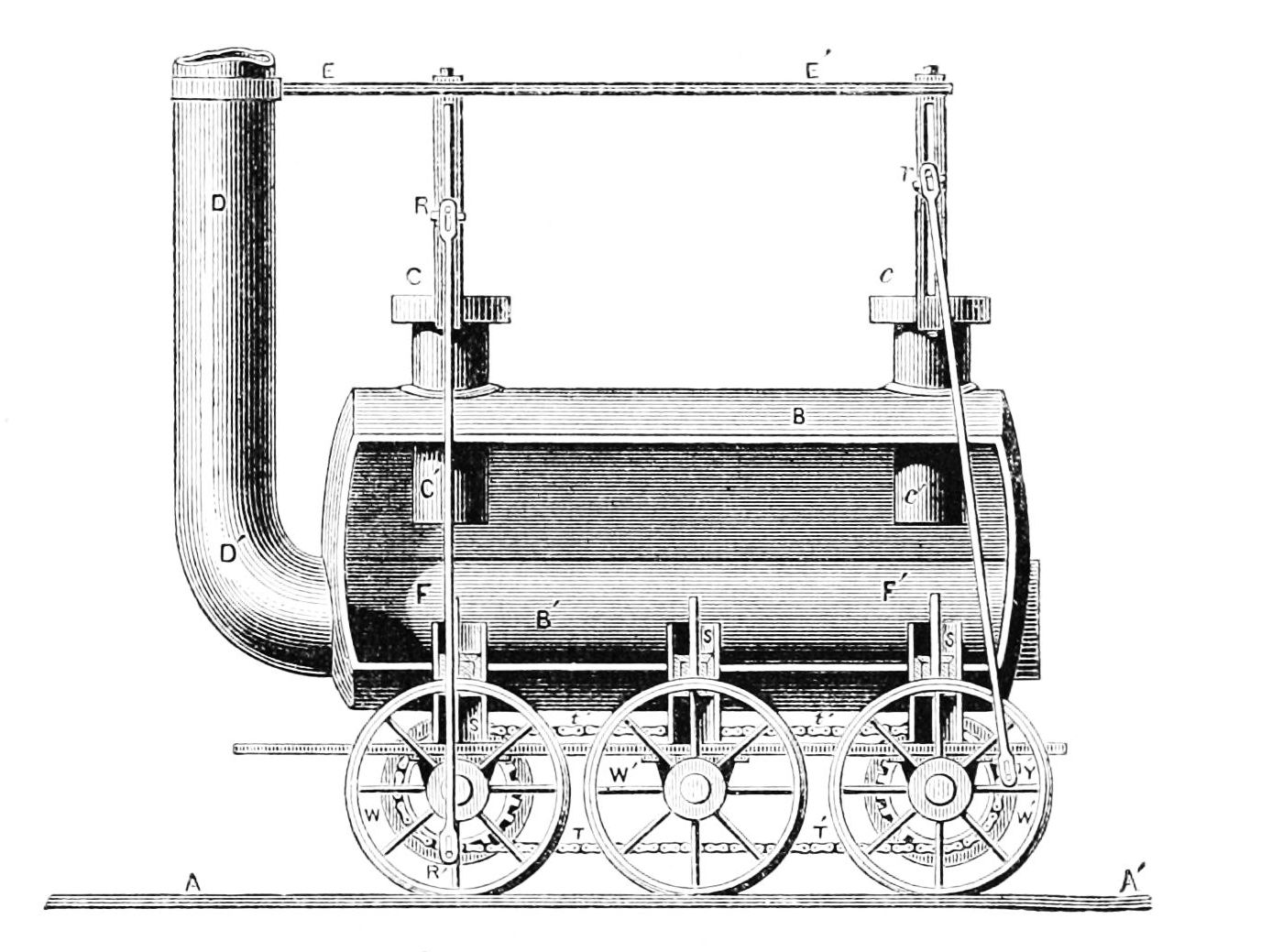
1877 drawing of a Stephenson locomotive described as 'of 1815', similar to The Duke but with flanged wheels and lacking the central sprocket wheel.

Probably in 1817 or early 1818 the Duke of Portland acquired a locomotive for the K&TR named The Duke, which was the first use of steam locomotive power in Scotland.

Bentinck was clearly interested in technical advance. In October 1813 one of his agents, John Bailey, made an enquiry to John Watson of the Kenton Waggonway, part of the estate of Charles John Brandling (in the family of Brandling of Newcastle): he asked about "the New Mode of Leading our Coals by means of Steam Engines instead of Horses". Watson's reply was:

Should the length of Lead from his Lordship's Concerns in Ayrshire be considerable, I have no doubt but a considerable Saving will be made by adopting Mr. Blenkinsop's new Method.

At the time, John Blenkinsop was engaged in developing the rack and pinion system for locomotives, as a means of overcoming the problem of limited adhesion force of locomotives of the time. As the rack was cast with the edge rails in use, this cannot have been an attractive adaptation. It may have been for that reason that it was not until 1817 that Bentinck arranged to acquire a steam locomotive from George Stephenson. It was a six-wheel design of Killingworth type; the first and last axles were driven by pistons in two vertical cylinders set in the boiler top, and a chain drive working on central sprocket wheels connected all three axles. Photographs of a model, considered to be accurate, are shown in the South Ayrshire Libraries history blog.

At this early date this was remarkably far-sighted. It had to be altered for a plateway, to have plain wheel treads. Unfortunately the L-shaped cast iron plates were not strong enough to support the five-ton locomotive's axle loading. Smiles recorded:

The first engine constructed by Mr Stephenson to order, after the Killingworth model, was made for the Duke of Portland in 1817, for use upon his tramroad, about ten miles long, extending from Kilmarnock to Troon, in Ayrshire. It was employed to haul the coals from the Duke's collieries along the line to Troon Harbour. Its use was however discontinued in view of the frequent breakages of the cast-iron rails, by which the working of the line was interrupted, and accordingly horses were again employed as before.

A local man, John Kelso Hunter, saw the engine when it started at Kilmarnock, and many years later recalled what he had seen as a boy:

The carcase sat on three pairs of wheels. The fore and aft pair were turned by long connecting rods fixed to a knob on the outer flange of the wheels and by the aid of cross-beams played up and down like a pair of frame-saws, turning the wheels like so many grindstones. On the centre of each axle-tree was a wheel with teeth, and an open chain revolved on the teeth in pinion form, keeping the valves in their place.

Hunter went on:

The locomotive was, like some great folk, before its time, as they had not yet discovered a way for its will. The road that used to be trod by the auld horse was in some places high in the centre, and on those heights did the teeth wheels on the axle trees rest, bending both them and the rods by which motion was attained. As a power out of place, the giant had to be laid aside for a time.

The load hauled by the locomotive was little more than that pulled by a good horse, although at about twice the velocity, advantages more than outweighed by the considerable costs involved, not least for the replacement of broken rails.

In the New Statistical Account of 1845 a brief description of the K&TR, written by three ministers of the town in 1839, ended rather casually:

We may mention that, in 1816, a locomotive engine, the first of its kind started in Scotland, was tried. It was intended to convey coal to Troon from the Duke of Portland's colliery, but, from its defective construction and ill adaptation to flat rails, it only drew ten tons at the rate of five miles an hour. Since then, no attempt has been made to introduce steam power.

Their date of 1816 seems too early. 1817 is the date of construction given by Smiles who was in communication with Robert Stephenson; the patent for this design of locomotive was granted to George Stephenson and William Losh in September 1816, and was first illustrated in a publication of May 1817.

The only mention of the locomotive in the surviving records of the Kilmarnock & Troon Railway is a complaint from a farmer at Parkthorn that "Cinders from a Steam Engine Waggon going along the Railway" had set fire to his crops. His complaint was received on 16 October 1821. Parkthorn is about 3 miles from Troon, which might suggest that the breakage of tramplates by the engine's weight was not as drastic as has been believed.

Smiles wrote in a footnote:

The iron wheels of this engine were afterwards removed, and replaced with wooden wheels, when it was again placed upon the road, and continued working until 1848. Its original cost was 750l [£750]. It was broken up, and the materials were sold, realizing only 13l [£13].

Robertson is highly sceptical of this often-repeated assertion, and (from letters in the Earl of Elgin's archives) Brotchie and Jack record that the locomotive was sold to the 7th Earl of Elgin for his railway in Fife; the price was £70, paid on 2 October 1824. It had been sent from Kilmarnock to Charlestown, Fife, in August/September 1824, but being found too heavy for the rails it was installed as a stationary pumping engine at Lord Elgin's limestone quarry in 1825. In 1830 it was transferred to one of Elgin's collieries near Dunfermline and its fate thereafter is unknown.

== Narrow gauge branch to Fairlie ==
In the original plan for the railway, a short branch line was indicated running to coal pits at Fairlie. It was to run due south from Gatehead, crossing the River Irvine a little to the west of Romeford Bridge.

In fact it was not built when the main line was built; the budget had already been considerably exceeded and the river bridge alone would have been a considerable expense. It was not until 1818 that the pits had a rail connection, and it was a longer branch line, about 2.5 miles (4.0 km) long, from Drybridge; this avoided a river crossing. It is often referred to as the Drybridge branch. The line skirted south of Girtridge Mount, continued past Harperland Bridge and then ran eastwards, south of the road that is now the A759.

There must have been some belated dissatisfaction with the plateway as a design, for this branch was built using fish-belly edge rails set in iron chairs spiked to stone blocks, and to a track gauge of 3 ft 4 in (1,016 mm), preventing through running on to the main line. It was horse-operated throughout its working life.

This branch was abandoned in 1846 or 1849, and on 26 February 1849 a new branch to Fairlie Colliery was opened on an alignment more suited to locomotive operation, from east of Gatehead; the surface works of the pit were some distance east of the original pithead.

== Traffic volumes ==
By 1839 the K&TR was carrying 150,000 tons of coal annually, and 70,000 tons of other freight. Passenger usage in 1837–1838 amounted to about 200,000 passenger-miles.

== Conversion for locomotive operation ==
In 1825 the Stockton and Darlington Railway opened; it used edge rails and locomotive power, and its immediate success ensured widespread fame; in 1826 the Monkland and Kirkintilloch Railway opened; it too used edge rails and some locomotive traction, and was hugely successful. The technical progress—and their own line's shortcomings—were noted by Portland and he personally visited the Ardrossan Railway and the Liverpool and Manchester Railway to evaluate the benefits of edge rails.

Kilmarnock and Troon Railway Act 1837
- Act of Parliament
- Parliament of the United Kingdom
- Long title: An Act to enable the Kilmarnock and Troon Railway Company to raise a farther Sum of Money; to alter and amend the Line of the said Railway; and for other Purposes relating thereto.
- Citation: 7 Will. 4 & 1 Vict. c. cv

Dates
- Royal assent: 12 July 1837

Text of statute as originally enacted

After some delay application was made to Parliament for authority to convert their line for locomotive operation, and was passed as the Kilmarnock and Troon Railway Act 1837 (7 Will. 4 & 1 Vict. c. cv). The work must have involved conversion of the track to edge rails and standard gauge, and easing of a number of sharp curves. At Laigh Milton Viaduct a new, wooden bridge was built a short distance to the south of the original viaduct, in order to ease the curve approaching it from the east; and the curve at Drybridge was eased. Locomotive operation started on 27 September 1841.

== Lease to a bigger railway ==
In 1839 the Glasgow, Paisley, Kilmarnock and Ayr Railway (GPK&AR) opened its main line between Irvine and Ayr, and was making progress in approaching Kilmarnock from Dalry (opened in 1843). The main line at Barassie was made by realigning the K&TR route there to make a full junction; the GPK&AR line ran direct from Barassie to Lochgreen Junction, with a "Troon" station half a mile or so east of the town.

Kilmarnock and Troon Railway Act 1846
- Act of Parliament
- Parliament of the United Kingdom
- Long title: An Act to enable the Kilmarnock and Troon Railway Company to let on Lease their Railway to the Glasgow, Paisley, Kilmarnock, and Ayr Railway Company; and to authorize the said Glasgow, Paisley, Kilmarnock, and Ayr Railway Company to alter Parts of the said Kilmarnock and Troon Railway, and to construct certain Branch Railways in connexion therewith.
- Citation: 9 & 10 Vict. c. ccxi

Dates
- Royal assent: 16 July 1846

The GPK&AR desired to consolidate their routes in the area, and they took a lease of the K&TR; this was authorised by the Kilmarnock and Troon Railway Act 1846 (9 & 10 Vict. c. ccxi) and was effective from 16 July 1846. On 1 March 1847 the GPK&AR opened a connecting line at Kilmarnock to its station, swinging north from a junction at St Marnock's. At the same time that company opened passenger stations at Gatehead and Drybridge. The Kilmarnock and Troon Railway Company continued to exist, receiving the lease charges, until on 16 July 1899 the line was bought by the GPK&A's successor, the Glasgow and South Western Railway. The Kilmarnock and Troon Railway Company was wound up in 1902; all the proprietors received their share value and a bonus of 25 s, and a 12 1/2% dividend.

Services continued on the central part of the line under the London, Midland and Scottish Railway and then British Rail; the local passenger service ceased on 3 March 1969. The termination from Barassie to Troon Harbour closed in 1973. (The loop line to Troon station ran alongside the original K&TR line at a higher level; it opened in 1892, and later became the present-day main line.)

== Connections to other lines ==
- Glasgow, Paisley, Kilmarnock and Ayr Railway at Barassie and Kilmarnock
- Glasgow, Barrhead and Kilmarnock Joint Railway at Kilmarnock

== Current operations ==
At the present day, parts of the original Kilmarnock and Troon Railway route form sections of the Network Rail route between Kilmarnock and Barassie. Passenger trains operated by ScotRail operate over the line as well as considerable coal traffic from further afield.

== Troon Burgh Seal ==
The former Burgh of Troon had a formal seal, on which was depicted a steam locomotive. It was a four-wheeled Killingworth type, but not The Duke; a reproduction of it is to be seen on a plaque on the sea wall. In 1903 the Burgh acquired an armorial coat of arms. This time, Stephenson's Rocket was depicted.

== Remains ==
The most important remaining structure on the line is Laigh Milton Viaduct.

At Kilmarnock, the terminal fronted St Marnock Street, now Portland Road, west of Dundonald Road junction and immediately west of the Holy Trinity Episcopal Church. The two semi-detached houses adjacent are on open ground depicted in the 1895 Ordnance Survey map, and may be on the land occupied by the railway terminal frontage. The south-west to north-east alignment can clearly be distinguished (from satellite imagery) in hedge lines near Ellis Street and again behind Rugby Road.

At Troon, the alignment can be inferred from satellite images, but little tangible remains, other than street and building names (Duke's Road, Portland House, Titchfield Cottage). Most of the present Kilmarnock to Barassie railway line is on the K&TR alignment.
