= Glasgow, Paisley, Kilmarnock and Ayr Railway =

Railway in Scotland

Overview
- Headquarters: Bridge Street, Glasgow
- Locale: Scotland
- Dates of operation: 5 August 1839–28 October 1850
- Successor: Glasgow and South Western Railway

Technical
- Track gauge: 4 ft 8 1/2 in (1,435 mm) standard gauge
- Length: 33 miles (53 km) (Paisley to Ayr, 1840)

The Glasgow, Paisley, Kilmarnock and Ayr Railway (GPK&AR) was a railway in Scotland that provided train services between Glasgow, Kilmarnock and Ayr. It opened its first line, between Glasgow and Ayr, in stages from 1839 to 1840. The section between Glasgow and Paisley was made jointly with the Glasgow, Paisley and Greenock Railway. Later it built a line from Dalry via Kilmarnock to Cumnock, linking there with the Glasgow, Dumfries and Carlisle Railway, and together forming a through route from Glasgow to Carlisle. The two companies merged to form the Glasgow and South Western Railway.

The original main line from Glasgow to Ayr, and the line from Kilmarnock to Carlisle, are in use today, although many intermediate stations and branch lines have closed.

== History ==
=== Earliest lines ===
Coal and other minerals were extracted in the west of Scotland from medieval times; getting the heavy product to market was always a challenge, and this encouraged the development of tracked systems; the earliest plateways (Note: Plateways used L-shaped rails and the wagons had plain wheels; the guidance was achieved through the upstand of the "L" and the wagons could run conveniently on ordinary ground at the terminals, for example.) in the vicinity of Ayr date from—at the latest—1775.

In 1812 the Kilmarnock and Troon Railway opened, also a horse-operated plateway, constructed to carry coal from the Kilmarnock area to the harbour at Troon, for onward conveyance by coastal shipping; it was the first railway in Scotland to have an authorising act of Parliament, the Kilmarnock and Troon Railway Act 1808 (48 Geo. 3. c. xlvi).

In the late 1820s, several further mineral railways were constructed in the west of Scotland: the Monkland and Kirkintilloch Railway, opened in 1826, proved a remarkable success in carrying coal from the collieries near Airdrie and was quickly followed by the Ballochney Railway. These "coal railways" used horse traction (mostly) and short cast iron rails on stone block sleepers. The key technical advance was that they used "edge rails": the guidance was provided by flanges on the wheels of the wagons. These lines showed the way forward.

In 1831 the Ardrossan Railway opened; it too was a horse-operated line using stone block sleepers, but passenger operation was a major part of its objective. It was conceived as a means of developing Ardrossan Harbour as the sea port for Glasgow. However, the promoters were unable to raise sufficient money to build the whole of their line; moreover recent improvements to the navigability of the River Clyde enabled sea-going ships to reach the city. Accordingly, the line was truncated, and only reached a terminal at Kilwinning and collieries east of that town. Nonetheless, it was a considerable commercial success, carrying passengers and in enabling coal, particularly from the pits belonging to the Earl of Eglinton to be exported at Ardrossan, and it further emphasised the viability of railways.

The Liverpool and Manchester Railway had opened the previous year, and proved a remarkable success in abstracting traffic from the parallel canal, and indicated that longer distances, not merely feeders to a harbour or from a colliery, could be dealt with, and everywhere business people were considering where a railway might advantageously be built next. When the Grand Junction Railway was authorised in 1833, it was possible to consider that railways might one day link central Scotland and the south of England.

=== Glasgow to Ayr and Kilmarnock ===
By 1835 the idea of building a railway from Glasgow into Ayrshire gained sufficient support for a survey to be commissioned from John Miller, a partner in the firm of Grainger and Miller, which had been heavily involved in the earlier railways in the west of Scotland. Miller proposed a route from Tradeston, in Glasgow at the south end of Glasgow Bridge, through Paisley and the Garnock Valley to Kilwinning and Ayr, with a branch from Dalry to Kilmarnock. The cost was to be £550,000 and a 10% return could be expected; notwithstanding the south-westerly course of the line, it was foreseen as a first step towards linking with railways in England.

Interests in Kilmarnock were dismayed to be consigned to a branch line, and the Burgh Council of Kilmarnock commissioned Scott, Stephen and Gale, an engineering partnership "which was not to make a mark on railway engineering" to plan a more direct route. Plotting a direct route was easy, but gradients were severe, earthworks would be formidable, and there was much less intermediate business. Gale was a rival canal company's engineer, and was hardly impartial. It was necessary to bring in someone to settle the matter; George Stephenson gave a report supporting Miller's choice of route.

Glasgow, Paisley, Kilmarnock and Ayr Railway Act 1837
- Act of Parliament
- Parliament of the United Kingdom
- Long title: An Act for making a Railway from Glasgow to Paisley and Ayr, and from a Point on the said Railway near Blairland to Kilmarnock, to be called "The Glasgow, Paisley, Kilmarnock, and Ayr Railway," with Branches.
- Citation: 7 Will. 4 & 1 Vict. c. cxvii

Dates
- Royal assent: 15 July 1837

Glasgow, Paisley, Kilmarnock and Ayr Railway Act 1842
- Act of Parliament
- Parliament of the United Kingdom
- Long title: An Act to amend the Acts relating to the Glasgow, Paisley, Kilmarnock, and Ayr Railway, and to grant further Powers to the Company of Proprietors thereof.
- Citation: 5 & 6 Vict. c. xxix

Dates
- Royal assent: 13 May 1842

Text of statute as originally enacted

Raising capital proved straightforward, and it was possible to present a bill for the line in the 1837 session of Parliament. There was strenuous opposition from river and canal interests, but this was overcome. At the time the Glasgow, Paisley and Greenock Railway (GP&GR) was also promoting its line, with a similar route from Tradeston to Paisley. It became obvious that Parliament would be hostile to the formation of two adjacent lines, so it was determined to build the line jointly as far as Paisley. Both the Glasgow, Paisley, Kilmarnock and Ayr Railway Act 1837 (7 Will. 4 & 1 Vict. c. cxvii) and the Glasgow, Paisley and Greenock Railway Act 1837 (7 Will. 4 & 1 Vict. c. cxvi) received royal assent on 15 July 1837. The Glasgow, Paisley, Kilmarnock and Ayr Railway Act 1837 authorised share capital of £625,000, and £208,300 in loans. The line was to be constructed simultaneously from each end, to prevent the experience of the Ardrossan Railway which failed to build the eastern end of its authorised line.

The gauge of the new line was not yet determined, although the estimates had been prepared on the basis that it would not exceed 6 feet. Many of Grainger and Miller's lines had been to a gauge of 4 ft 6in; the Dundee and Newtyle Railway (1831) had been at 4 ft 6 1/2 in (1,384 mm) and the Dundee and Arbroath Railway, authorised in 1836, was to be 5 ft 6 in (1,680 mm). Connections to local railways were considered important in determining the gauge, but the engineer Joseph Locke urged that conformity to the gauge of the English railways was important, and in the end this was adopted: standard gauge, 4 ft 8 1/2 in (1,435 mm). (Note: Locke was advising the Glasgow Paisley and Greenock company, and it was their decision to conform to the gauge of railways in England that obliged the GPK&AR to follow suit.)

=== Construction starts ===
Construction of the line, supervised by Grainger and Miller, proved challenging, as a large-scale contracting industry was not yet in place in Scotland; nor was large-scale financing. At the end of 1838 Miller was instructed to build a branch from Barassie to Troon Harbour, earlier thoughts of taking over the Kilmarnock and Troon Railway and converting it—as it was then still a horse-operated plateway—having been dropped.

In 1839 the Ardrossan and Johnstone Railway was engaged in converting its gauge to standard so as to interwork with the GPK&AR (with which it was to connect at Kilwinning), and the following year it changed its name to the Ardrossan Railway.

=== Opening—in stages ===
After a directors' special run between Ayr (north of the river, at Newton-on-Ayr) and Irvine on 19 July 1839, the line opened to the public between those points on 5 August 1839. The Eglinton Tournament, held on Friday 30 August, resulted in huge demand for tickets. For the railway, this was an enormous success and that limited section of the line made a surplus of £500 from opening to the end of that year. The section between Irvine and Kilwinning opened on 23 March 1840.

On 13 July 1840 the joint line between Paisley and a temporary terminus in Glasgow at Bridge Street was ready for a demonstration run, opening fully to the public the following day.

The remainder of the main line opened in further stages, and the dates for the whole line were:

- Glasgow Bridge Street (temporary station) to Paisley (Joint Line): 14 July 1840;
- Paisley to a temporary station at Howwood (then spelt Howood): 21 July 1840;
- Howood to Beith: 12 August 1840; Howood station then closed;
- Beith to Kilwinning: 21 July 1840;
- Kilwinning to Irvine: 23 March 1840;
- Irvine to Ayr (Newton-on-Ayr): 19 July 1839.

The permanent Bridge Street station opened on 6 April 1841.

The GPK&AR moved their head offices to Bridge Street from Gordon Street in March 1841.

The construction of the main line was stated to have overrun estimated costs considerably, and at a shareholders' meeting in February 1841 it was stated that as a result, the Kilmarnock branch could not be started until authority for additional capital had been obtained, and of course the money actually raised. Kilmarnock had to be content with a coach connection until the line there from Dalry Junction opened on 4 April 1843.

=== By rail and sea to London ===
The opening of the line and the conversion of the Ardrossan railway to run in connection, enabled a fast service—26 1/2 hours—between Glasgow and London to be instituted. The fast steamer Fire King plied on alternate days between Ardrossan and Liverpool; from May 1841 the English terminal was transferred to Fleetwood following the opening of the Preston & Wyre Railway and Dock Company. The service only lasted a few days and was not a commercial success; the GPK&AR sold the vessel to James Burns, who continued the service but "soon withdrew it", transferring the boat to a route to Ireland.

=== The railway route to England ===
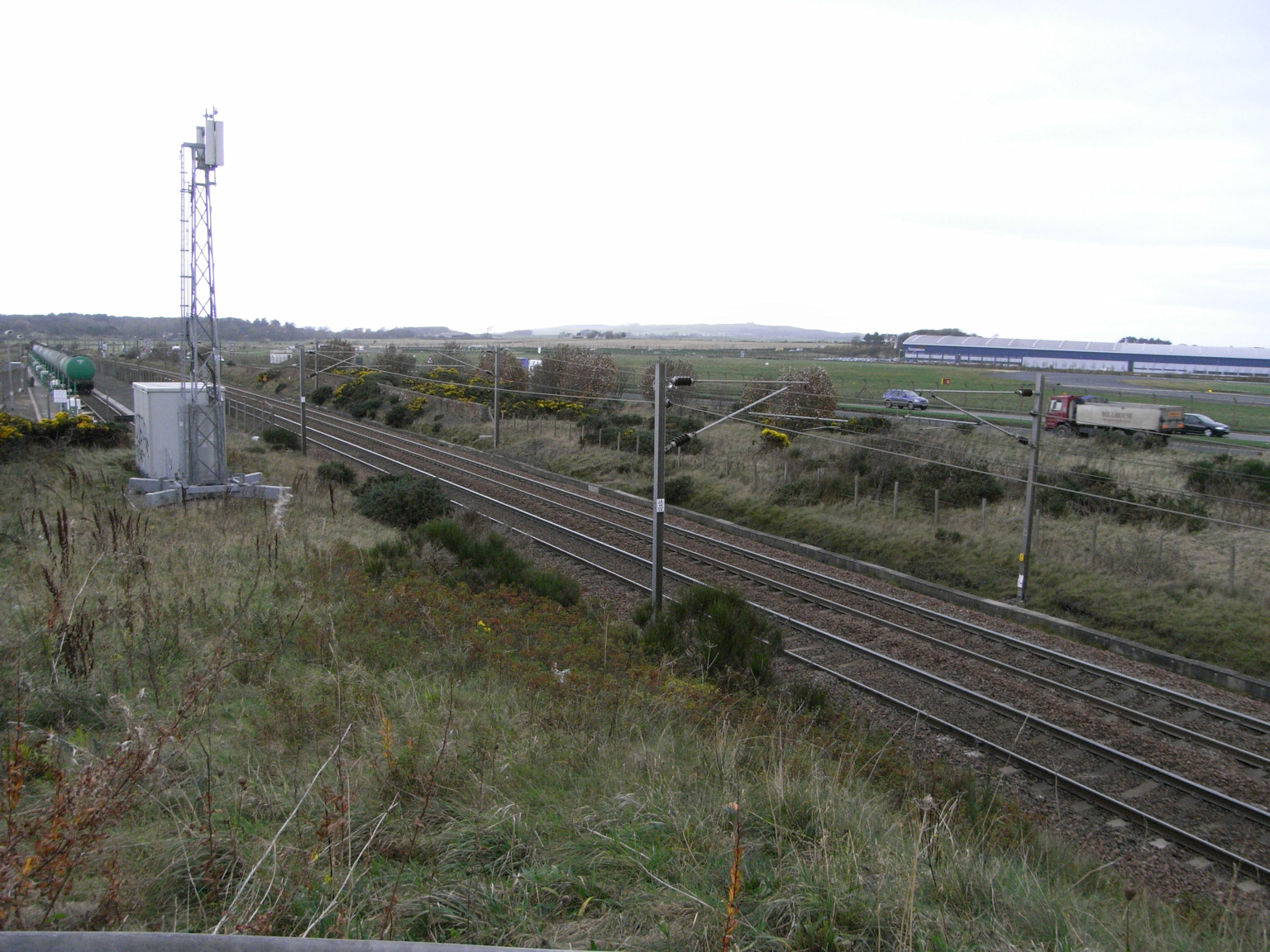
The site of the closed Monkton station in 2007

From the time the GPK&AR was authorised, controversy raged about the route a railway to England might take. It was plain that Carlisle would be reached from the south; a direct route from Glasgow over the Southern Uplands, the route that became known as the Annandale line, would involve severe gradients, and pass through almost unpopulated territory. The locomotives available at the time were not thought to be capable of climbing the steep inclines, and rope haulage was put forward by some as the solution. By contrast, a route from Kilmarnock through Cumnock and Dumfries—the Nithsdale line—would have much easier gradients and pass through considerable population centres, bringing in additional traffic. Moreover, the Nithsdale route would be much cheaper to build.

The government intervened and in 1839 appointed two royal commissioners to determine the way forward; at this time there was a presumption that one railway route from Scotland to England would suffice; but which? There was no consensus between expert witnesses, and in 1840 the commissioners reported that the Annandale route should prevail, but "the promoters must prove their bona fide intention to complete the English portion of the line, otherwise preference would be given to the East Coast route" (from Edinburgh via Berwick-upon-Tweed and Newcastle upon Tyne). This stalled the whole process: there was no such single group as "the promoters" of any route via Carlisle, and in fact the Lancaster and Carlisle Railway was not authorised until 1844.

Glasgow, Paisley, Kilmarnock and Ayr Railway Act 1845
- Act of Parliament
- Parliament of the United Kingdom
- Long title: An Act to authorize an Extension of the Glasgow, Paisley, Kilmarnock, and Ayr Railway to near Cumnock; and to amend the Acts relating to such Railway.
- Citation: 8 & 9 Vict. c. xcv

Dates
- Royal assent: 21 July 1845

The report of the commissioners was not binding, and the rivalry between supporters of the two routes intensified. An independent Glasgow, Dumfries and Carlisle Railway was proposed, to build from Carlisle to meet the GPK&AR, and the GPK&AR itself proposed several branches, mostly for tactical reasons, to weaken or exclude the Caledonian Railway (CR), as the dominant supporter of the Annandale route. Of these only an extension from Kilmarnock to Horsecleugh, south of the mining town of Old Cumnock was authorised, by the Glasgow, Paisley, Kilmarnock and Ayr Railway Act 1845 (8 & 9 Vict. c. xcv) of 21 July 1845. The CR case was strengthened by its intended branch to Edinburgh; (Note: That is, the proposed line from Carlisle would fork and serve both Glasgow and Edinburgh, while a route via Dumfries and Kilmarnock could not reach Edinburgh so directly.) moreover locomotive designs were being improved, and the capacity to haul trains over the steep gradients of the Annandale route was diminishing in importance. In parliamentary hearings in 1845, the Caledonian Railway passed the Commons and despite the GPK&AR fighting on in the Lords, the Caledonian Railway was authorised, in preference to the Nithsdale route, on 31 July 1845.

The Glasgow, Dumfries and Carlisle Railway felt the setback most keenly, as it had no railway and had just been refused sanction to build one.

=== A resilient mood; but then collapse ===
The GPK&AR was at least able to see a positive future without the line to Carlisle; a 6% dividend was declared in August 1845. The shareholders approved the lease of the Kilmarnock and Troon Railway (K&TR); as a horse-operated plateway this would need to be converted and upgraded at a cost of £40,000, but the process would give much improved access to the harbour for collieries in the area. In addition a mineral line was to be built from Auchinleck, on the Cumnock extension, to Muirkirk. There had long been an ironworks at Muirkirk which suffered from the disadvantage of poor transport links to market; in addition a new ironworks at Lugar would also be accessed by the line.

The 1846 session of Parliament experienced a snowstorm of bills for new railways; many of these threatened to encroach on the GPK&AR area of influence and abstract business; several schemes were promoted by the Caledonian Railway or its allies; in self-defence the GPK&AR itself promoted numerous schemes—in fact 25 branches as well as a bill nominally by the K&TR to authorise the modernisation works—to head off some of the encroachment.

In this session, the remodelled Glasgow, Dumfries and Carlisle Railway (GD&CR) got its authorising act of Parliament, the Glasgow, Dumfries, and Carlisle Railway Act 1846 (9 & 10 Vict. c. ccclxxii) on 13 August, to build from Horsecleugh (near Cumnock, the southern limit of the GPK&AR authorisation) to Gretna Junction, reaching Carlisle from Gretna over the Caledonian Railway line. The act of Parliament stipulated that on actual completion of the construction, the GD&CR should merge with the GPK&AR to form a new company, the Glasgow and South Western Railway.

This huge volume of intended activity was fuelled by financial speculation—the "railway mania". It appeared that fortunes could be made by subscribing to shares in new lines, and the subscriber only had to put a small deposit down until construction got under way. Over-optimism led to stark inability to pay up when the calls (for cash on subscribed shares) came in, and suddenly money was impossible to come by. Most of the speculative schemes collapsed at once.

=== Regaining momentum ===
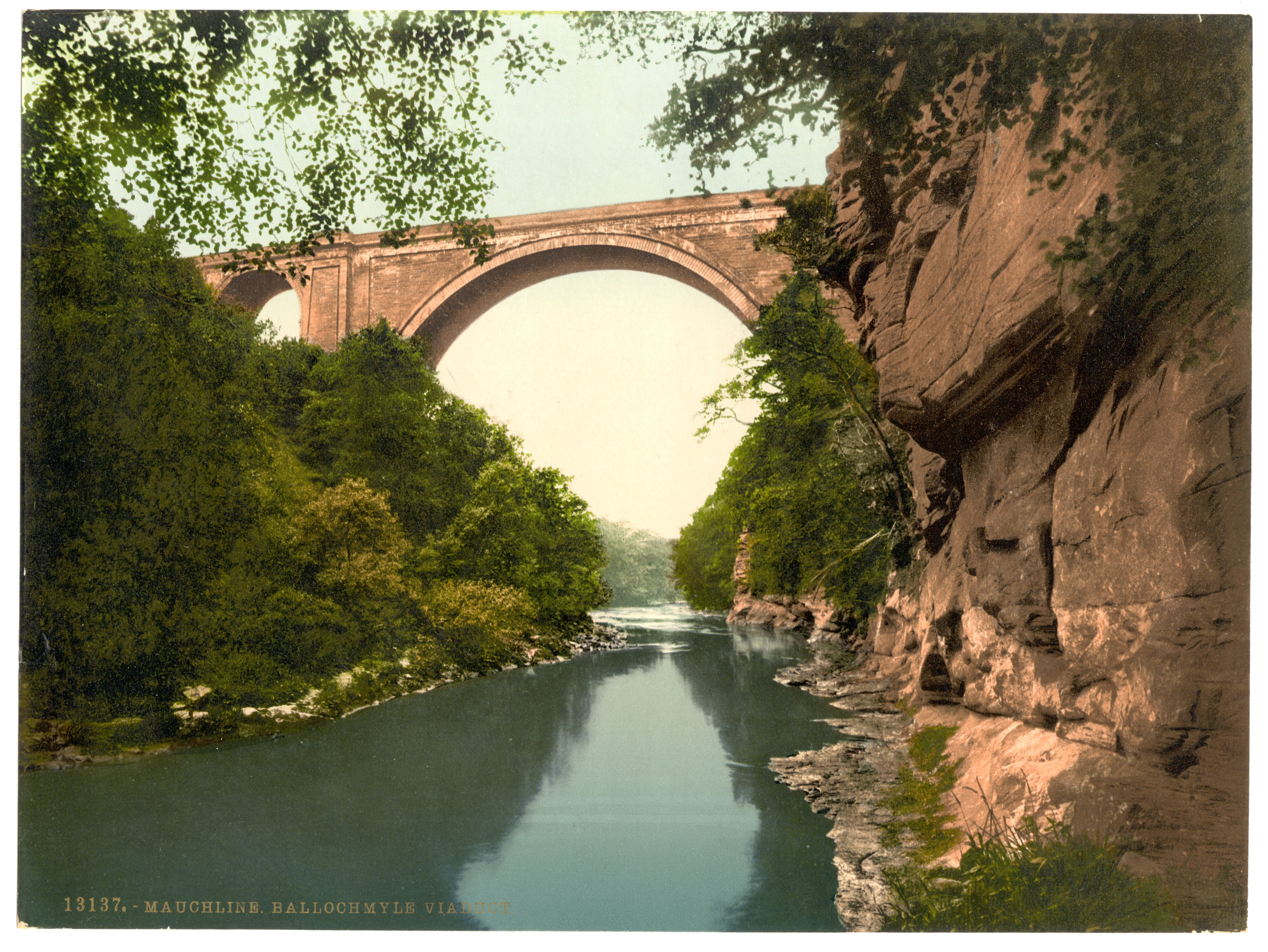
Ballochmyle Viaduct

Although in difficulties for cash, the GD&CR started construction; obstructions by the Caledonian Railway at the Gretna end were eventually resolved, and a fresh act of Parliament, the Glasgow and South Western Railway Incorporation Act 1847 (10 & 11 Vict. c. clxxxiii) structuring the merger with the GPK&AR was passed (on 9 July 1847), but "so heavily amended … as to be useless to the Companies".

On 1 March 1847 the Kilmarnock and Troon line reopened, as a standard gauge locomotive operated railway. It had been closed for the modernisation work, and it now provided a proper link from Kilmarnock to the coast. The GPK&AR opened a short connecting spur between its own line and the K&TR in Kilmarnock. On the same day a branch at Dalry to Swinlees was opened; there was a copper mine there.

On 22 July 1847 the company acquired control of the Paisley and Renfrew Railway under the Paisley and Renfrew Railway (Sale and Improvement) Act 1847 (10 & 11 Vict. c. ccxxix). The purchase had earlier been agreed by the proposed Paisley, Barrhead and Hurlet Railway, supported by the GPK&AR, for £34,000. It was horse-operated and had a track gauge of 4 ft 4 in (1,320 mm). The line was loss-making and had no practical value other than the tactical one of securing territory against competing companies. (Note: Awdry states on page 98 that the sale was completed on 31 July 1852.) The Paisley Barrhead and Hurlet Bill failed in the 1847 session of Parliament and was re-presented in 1848; the share capital proposed had risen to £230,000; during the Lords' hearings it became plain that running powers were likely to be granted to the Barrhead and Neilston Direct Railway, an offshoot of the Caledonian Railway. The GPK&AR had subscribed to £150,000 in face value of the shares of this proposed line, with the sole intention of excluding the Caledonian Railway from the area. The GPK&AR now petitioned against the bill, but this was unsuccessful, and the Paisley, Barrhead and Hurlet Railway Act 1848 (11 & 12 Vict. c. clv) received royal assent, with the running powers clause, on 31 August 1848.

Having a majority shareholding, the GPK&AR was able to stall any plans to proceed with construction of the Hurlet line, but on 9 October a special GPK&AR shareholders' meeting reviewed the financial commitments made by their board in the frenzied days of 1845 and 1846, when support to numerous new lines had been committed; the meeting left the directors in no doubt as to their disapproval.

On 28 May 1848 a line opened between Irvine and Busbie, about 2 miles (3.2 km) north-west of Kilmarnock; a short branch to Irvine Harbour opened on the same day. The Cumnock line as far as Auchinleck and the Muirkirk branch from that point, opened on 9 August. This included the Ballochmyle Viaduct, located near Catrine; it was built with a central span of 181 and 175 feet (55 and 53 m) high above the River Ayr. It was the largest masonry arch span in the world at the time of its completion, and is the highest railway bridge in Britain.

Also on 9 August 1848 the Newmilns branch opened from Hurlford to Galston.

A branch to Perceton Colliery (a short northward spur from the Irvine–Busbie line) opened on 26 June 1848. On 1 July 1848, a Perceton branch from the Doura line of the Ardrossan Railway opened. It was actually the only part of the Glasgow, Kilmarnock and Ardrossan Railway to be built; it became part of the Ardrossan Railway.

On 26 February 1849 the Fairlie branch of the former Kilmarnock and Troon Railway was opened.

=== Completing the line to Carlisle ===
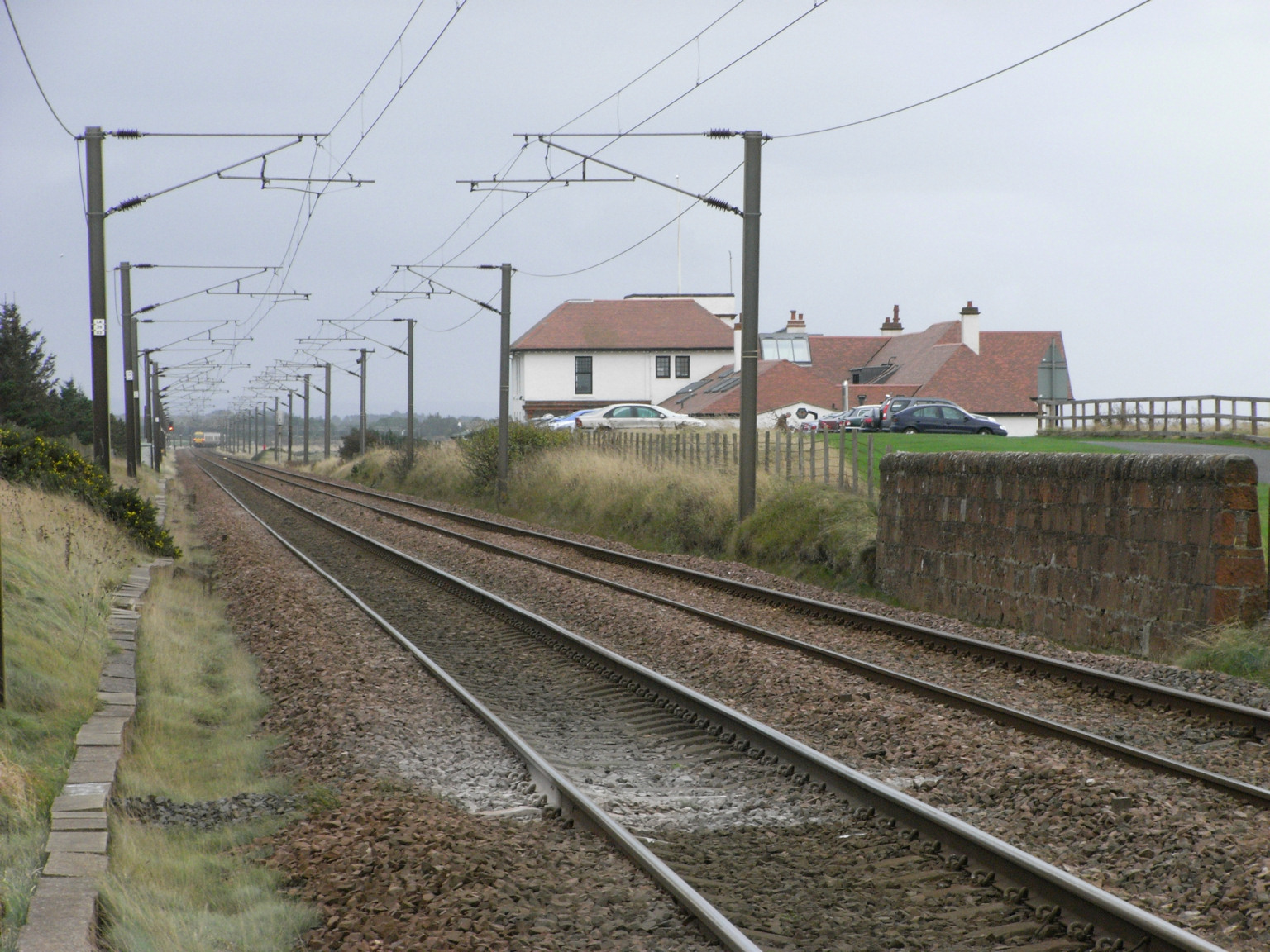
The site of the closed Gailes station in 2007

The Glasgow, Dumfries and Carlisle Railway (GD&CR) had been proceeding with construction as fast as funds would allow, and on 23 August 1848 it opened its line between Gretna and Dumfries. At Gretna passengers could change to Caledonian Railway trains; the Dumfries station was a temporary structure south of Annan Road. The GPK&AR provided the rolling stock to its junior partner. The GD&CR was insolvent, owing £230,000 and needing £602,000 to complete the line; these facts emerged after another bruising session at which shareholders criticised the liabilities and futile Parliamentary expenses incurred by the directors of both companies. (In fact there was considerable overlap on the two boards.)

By March 1849 these negative feelings led to the GPK&AR chairman, James McCall being removed along with several directors; Andrew Orr took over as chairman, but for a period the remaining directors from the earlier years formed an obstructive group; their motivation seemed to be the personal liabilities they had taken on on behalf of the company, and their wish to be indemnified against personal loss. Orr eventually resolved these issues and on 24 August, Orr held shareholders' meetings of each company (separately) and announced that all the "old" directors had resigned, and that a new board would shortly be formed, with an identical composition for the two companies. The engineer John Miller also resigned at this time in the interest of economy. All the remaining GD&CR construction contracts had been let and were proceeding, and the two companies would operate as a single unit using GPK&AR rolling stock.

On 20 May 1850 the line was opened between Auchinleck and New Cumnock, completing the GPK&AR southward extension and including the northern extremity of the GD&CR line.

By 28 October 1850 the final section of the main line to Carlisle was completed by the GD&CR, and trains began to run through to Carlisle; evidently the difficulty with the Caledonian Railway from Gretna southwards had been resolved.

=== The Glasgow and South Western Railway is formed ===
The GPK&AR and the GD&CR had already been authorised by the Glasgow, Dumfries, and Carlisle Railway Act 1846 (9 & 10 Vict. c. ccclxxii) and Glasgow and South Western Railway Incorporation Act 1847 (10 & 11 Vict. c. clxxxiii) to amalgamate at this stage. In fact the GD&CR was absorbed by the GPK&AR which then changed its name to the G&SWR; the Glasgow and South Western Railway Incorporation Act 1847 provided for the vesting of the GD&CR in the GPK&AR on the date of the opening throughout of the GD&CR, when that company would be dissolved. From the date of the amalgamation the company would be called the Glasgow and South Western Railway.

On 28 October 1850 the Glasgow and South Western Railway started its existence.

== Train services ==
The first services on the line in 1839, between Irvine and Ayr, travelled at an average of 21 miles per hour (34 km/h) with stoppages averaging 1 min 6 secs per station, meaning a trip along the entire 10 1/2-mile (17 km) line at that point would have taken around 35 1/2 minutes. The maximum fare for passengers at the time was 2d, 1 1/2d and 1d for first, second and third class respectively. 137,117 passengers travelled on the line during the first year of services.

In conjunction with the Ardrossan Railway, which was regauged in 1840, on alternate days a fast steamboat service ran between Ardrossan Pier and Liverpool, and vice versa. This connected with the Grand Junction Railway and London and Birmingham Railway's expresses to London. In 1841 the steamboat service was transferred from Liverpool to the new Port at Fleetwood, Lancashire.

In March 1850 the passenger train service consisted of five trains southbound and four northbound on the Ayr line; these called at all stations except that Cochrane Mill was served only by the first southbound and last northbound trains; the journey time to Ayr was two to two and a half hours. The service between Glasgow and Muirkirk had four trains each way, but only two went throughout; one trip was to and from Auchinleck only, and one was to and from Kilmarnock; there were connecting trains from Ayr to Irvine. The journey time Glasgow to Muirkirk was three hours. Three of the four Kilmarnock line trains were combined with Ayr trains between Glasgow and Irvine, and between Dalry and Kilmarnock trains travelled via Irvine and Dreghorn.

In addition a "Glasgow to Troon direct" train was advertised, running on Wednesdays and Fridays in connection with the steamers to Liverpool, leaving Glasgow at 4.30 pm. This is the departure time of an ordinary parliamentary train to Troon and Ayr, so it does not appear to be a separate boat train.

== Rolling stock ==
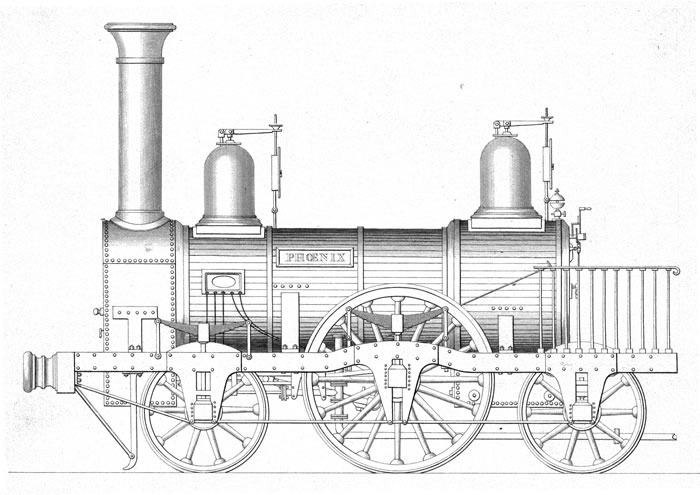
Phoenix - an Edington and Son 2-2-2 locomotive built 1840-1841

The original locomotives used on the line in 1839 were similar to those used on the London and Birmingham Railway, having 12-inch (305 mm) cylinders, 18-inch (457 mm) stroke and four wheels. Designed by Bury, the 2-2-0 locomotives cost around £1,200 per engine were given the names Mazeppa, Mercury, Marmion and Cutty-sark. Two more of the same design were obtained in 1841 named Stuart and Bute. The six original locomotives were withdrawn between 1858 and 1860. In 1840-1841 twelve 2-2-2 locomotives (designed by company engineer J. Miller) were built and given names such as Bruce, Eglinton, Phoenix, Prince Albert and Loudoun. Bruce and Cutty-sark hauled the first special train from Glasgow to Ayr on 11 August 1840.

Early passenger carriages were of similar design to those used on railways in England at the time, holding eighteen passengers on first class carriages, and thirty on second class. Third class carriages originally had seats, but on 15 April 1840 a board decision declared that all future third class carriages were to be made without seats. All existing third class carriages also had their seats removed. A later board decision on 3 July 1840 ordered that third class carriages would be situated closest to the engine, followed by second class, with first class at the rear.

== Development under the Glasgow and South Western Railway ==
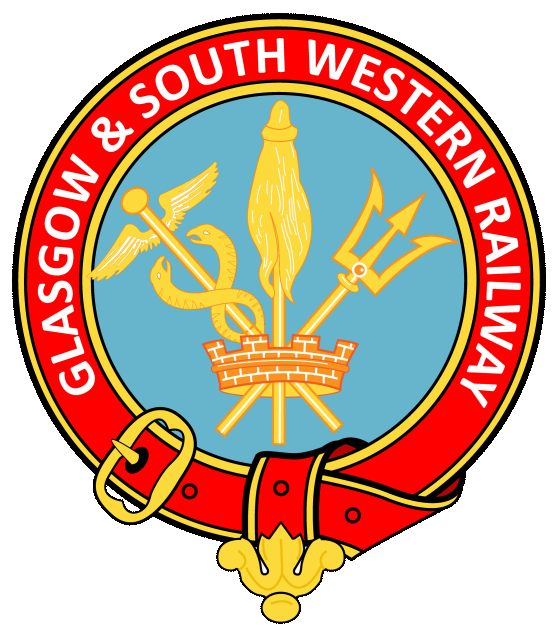
The Glasgow and South Western Railway emblem, originally used by the GPK&AR.

On taking over the GPK&AR and GD&CR networks, the Glasgow and South Western Railway had a main line from Glasgow to Ayr, and from Glasgow to Carlisle, and some branches. It already served areas rich in minerals, especially coal and ironstone, and had useful access to west coast ports.

It had two main limitations. The first was that the Carlisle line was very circuitous compared with the competing Caledonian Railway (CR) route via Beattock, which also served Edinburgh; the route also depended on running over the CR from Gretna Junction to Carlisle, and needed accommodation at Carlisle station. The CR was to prove a formidable competitor for Anglo-Scottish traffic, both passenger and goods, and much energy and money were expended in securing exclusive territory for the G&SWR, and in keeping the CR out.

The second issue was that both the Glasgow and Ayr stations were awkward. The Glasgow station, at Bridge Street, was on the south of the Clyde (and Glasgow Bridge carried a toll at the time). The Ayr station was north of the River Ayr, and although not inconvenient for passenger access to the town, the location prevented southward railway extension.

The means adopted to overcome these challenges are described more fully in the Glasgow and South Western Railway and other articles. In overview:

- The company encouraged local promoters to build railways that extended or fed the G&SWR; often this was with substantial financial support from the company;
- a number of branches were constructed directly; this was especially the case to serve districts where mining was dominant;
- in later years a number of agreements were finalised with the Caledonian Railway over primacy of territory and limitation on the formation of encroaching routes;
- the Ayr and Dalmellington Railway, encouraged by the G&SWR, built its line southwards from Falkland Junction, immediately north of Ayr station; the new line passed round the east side of the burgh, and a new through station for Ayr was provided on it in 1857; after initial reluctance, this became the main passenger station for Ayr;
- with the North British Railway, the G&SWR sponsored the City of Glasgow Union Railway, which opened a line crossing the Clyde in Glasgow and making a south to north link line; as part of that scheme a new passenger terminal at St Enoch was opened, and (no less important) a central goods terminal at College, on land vacated by the University of Glasgow; the river crossing and a temporary central station were in use in 1870 and the St Enoch station was opened in 1876; after a short time the Bridge Street station was vacated by the G&SWR;
- the Glasgow, Barrhead and Kilmarnock Joint Railway was made, jointly with the Caledonian Railway, forming a direct route between Glasgow and Kilmarnock, and shortening the route from Glasgow to Carlisle; this opened in 1873; the Dalry to Kilmarnock line was reduced in importance for express passenger trains, but continued as an important link from Carlisle to the West Coast ports, and for mineral and goods traffic.

== Twentieth century closures ==
In the first half of the twentieth century, the extractive industries of the West of Scotland underwent a metamorphosis. The small pits were either worked out or were mechanised and merged. A similar process took place in the iron and steel production industries, and the medium scale iron works in many locations closed down. Many railway branch lines had been heavily dependent on business from the mineral industries, and could not be sustained when they had gone, but some continued as passenger lines where they served sizable communities.

The heavy rationalisation process in British Railways in the 1960s, often referred to as the Beeching Axe, resulted in a reassessment of those lines, at a time when efficient bus services were abstracting passengers from often infrequent and inconvenient train services.

The effect of this process on the original GPK&AR network can be summarised thus:

- Glasgow to Ayr: still operating; electrified 19 January 1987; a diversion to serve Troon more conveniently replaced a short section of the original main line there in 1892;
- Dalry to Kilmarnock: closed to local passenger trains on 18 April 1966.; a night sleeper train continued running over the line, giving a direct Paisley to London service, but the line closed completely on 23 October 1973;
- Kilmarnock to Horsecleugh: still operating as part of the Glasgow - Kilmarnock - Dumfries - Carlisle route;
- Irvine to Busbie Junction: closed to local passenger traffic on 6 April 1964, and closed completely 11 October 1965;
- Irvine Harbour branch; closed;
- Perceton branch; closed;
- Barassie to Kilmarnock (former Kilmarnock and Troon Railway): still operating;
- Auchinleck to Newmilns: the section between Auchinleck and Cronberry closed to passenger traffic on 3 July 1950. The line between Cronberry and Newmilns was part of a route between Ayr and Muirkirk, but this too closed to passenger trains on 1 October 1950. In 1951 services were reinstated for two weeks to accommodate diverted trains from Edinburgh to Ayr. The entire line from Auchinleck to Muirkirk then closed to regular passenger traffic on 1 October 1950; the line was used until 1976.

== Topography ==
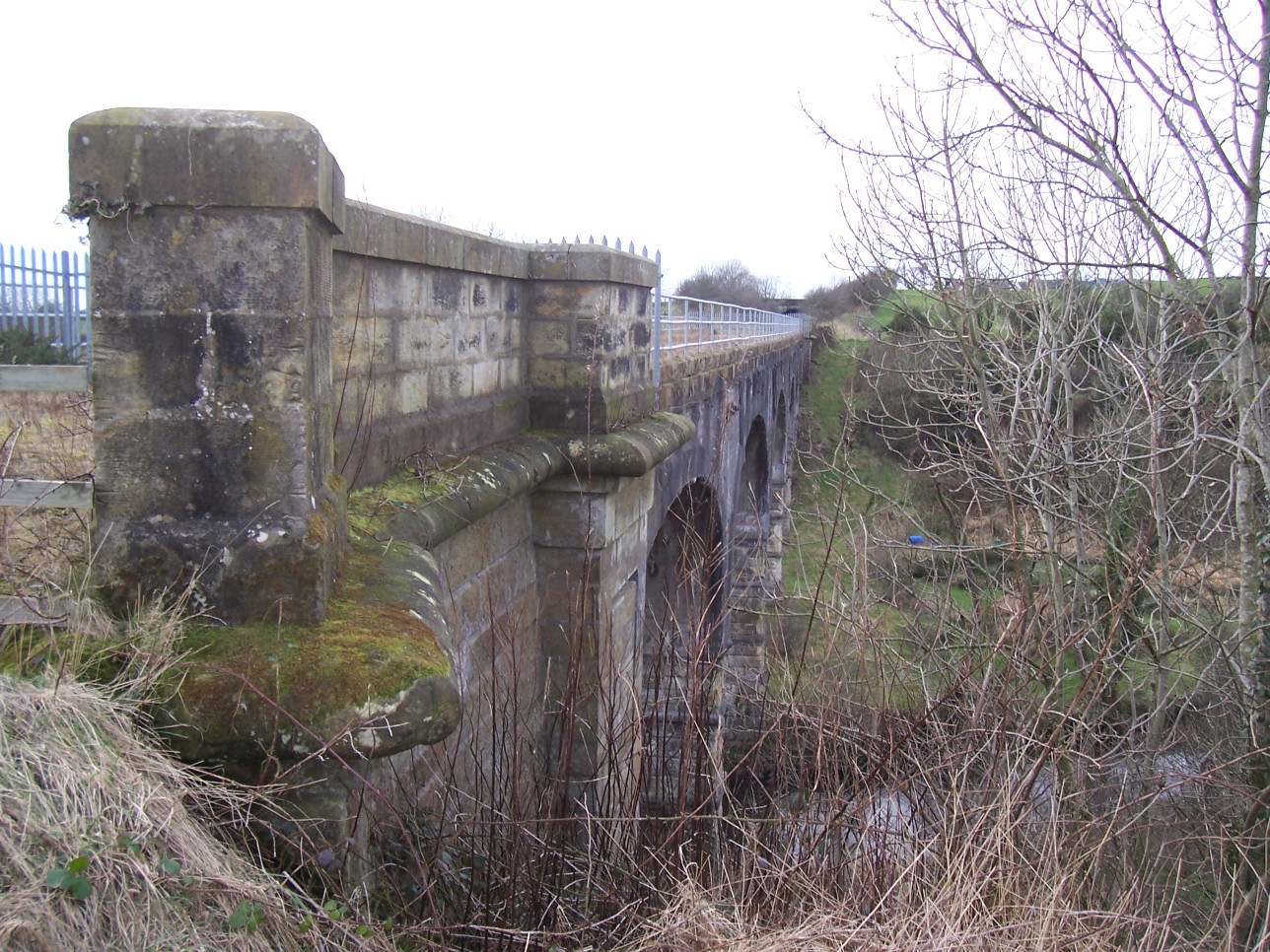
A viaduct on the closed Dalry to Kilmarnock line in 2007

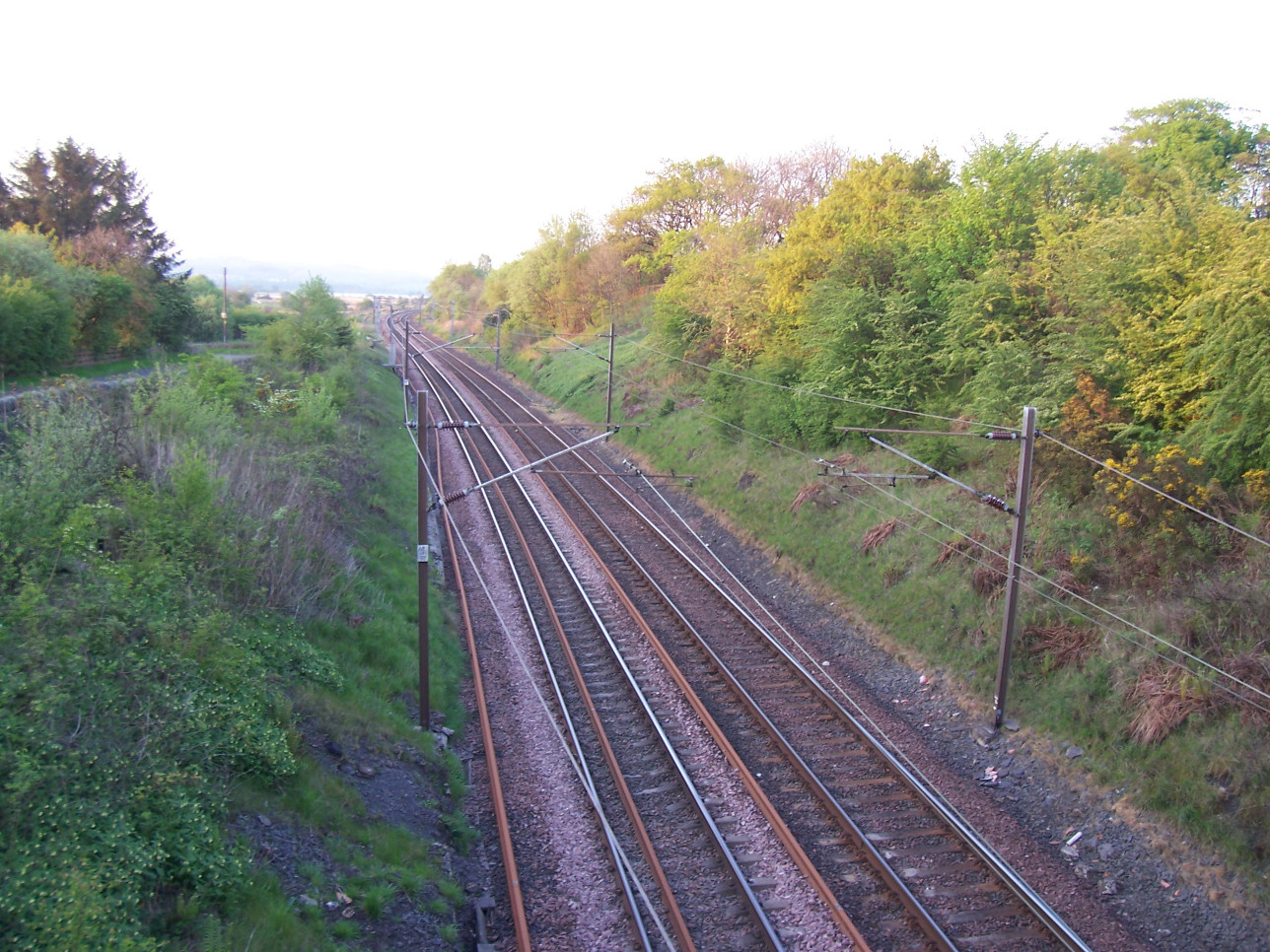
The line near the site of the closed Beith station in 2007

Note: station and route details are confined to those opened during GPK&AR days, and the subsequent history of those stations and routes; details of stations opened on the route later than 1850, and of contiguous routes opened later, can be found in the Glasgow and South Western Railway article. Locations in italic were not passenger stations; entries in bold are passenger stations open at the present.

=== Bridge Street to Ayr ===
GPK&AR trains used the Glasgow and Paisley Joint Line as far as Paisley; it was joint with the Glasgow, Paisley and Greenock Railway. The line between Shields Junction and Paisley was quadrupled in 1880s. It was reduced again to double track during the mid-1960s. A third track was added once more in early 2012.

- Bridge Street
- Moss Road; opened 1843; closed 1843; **Cardonald** station opened on the same site 1879;
- Paisley; renamed **Paisley Gilmour Street** from 1883;
- **Johnstone**; renamed Johnstone High from 1851 until 1962;
- Cochrane Mill; opened 1846; renamed Milliken Park 1853; closed 1966; a new **Milliken Park** was opened a short distance nearer Dalry on 15 May 1989;
- Howood; opened 1840; closed 1840; re-opened as Howwood 1876; closed 1955; reopened 28 October 1988;
- Lochwinnoch
- Kilbirnie; opened 1841; renamed **Glengarnock** 1951;
- Swinlees Junction; junction for mineral line from Swinlees; (the branch opened 1847; cut back to Boredon 1920; closed in the 1950s);
- **Dalry**;
- Dalry Junction; opened 1850; closed 1860; junction to Kilmarnock line;
- **Kilwinning**; junction to Ardrossan Railway;
- **Irvine**; junction for line to Busbie and for line to Irvine Harbour;
- **Barassie**; junction for line from Kilmarnock; junction for line to Troon Harbour; the station probably did not have platforms on the Kilwinning line during the lifetime of the GPK&AR.

The section of line between Barassie and Lochgreen Junction closed in 1975.

- Troon; closed 1892 when the new station on the loop line was opened;
- Lochgreen Junction;
- Monkton; closed 1940;
- Prestwick;
- Ayr; closed 1857 when all passenger services were transferred to the through station.

=== Dalry Junction–Kilmarnock–Auchinleck ===
- Dalry Junction; (above);
- Stewarton; renamed Cunninghamhead 1873; closed 1950; (the name Stewarton was transferred to a station on the Glasgow, Barrhead and Kilmarnock Joint Railway, nearer the town);
- Busby; (spelt Busbie when the line was being planned); closed 1850; re-opened as Crosshouse 1872; closed 1966;
- **Kilmarnock**;
- Hurlford; closed 1955;
- Mauchline; closed 1965;
- **Auchinleck**; closed 1965; re-opened 1984;
- Old Cumnock; renamed Cumnock 1955; closed 1965;
- Horsecleugh; end-on junction with the Glasgow, Dumfries and Carlisle Railway; no station or siding facilities.

=== Irvine to Busby line ===
- **Irvine**; see above;
- Dreghorn; closed 1850; opened 1868; closed 1964;
- junction for the Perceton branch, open 1848 to 1950;
- Busby; see above.

=== Troon Harbour to Kilmarnock ===
- Troon Harbour;
- **Barassie**; see above;
- Drybridge; closed 1969;
- Gatehead; closed 1969;
- **Kilmarnock**; see above.

=== Hurlford to Galston ===
- Hurlford; see above;
- Mayfield Junction; junction to Mayfield goods station; branch cut back to Fireclay Works 1930; closed 1965;
- Galston; closed 1964;
- Newmilns.

== 1994 to present: Privatisation and current operations ==
Privatisation resulted in the former GPK&AR being under the ownership of Railtrack, and then from 2002, Network Rail. Passenger services between Glasgow and Ayr operate under the title Ayrshire Coast Line (which also incorporates the Largs branch), and passenger train services on the line from Kilmarnock to Carlisle are called the Glasgow South Western Line. Local services are run by First ScotRail on behalf of Strathclyde Partnership for Transport.

== Connections to other lines ==
- Ardrossan Railway at Kilwinning and Dubbs Junction
- Ayr and Dalmellington Railway at Falkland Junction
- Ayr to Mauchline Branch and associated lines at Prestwick, Falkland Junction, (near Newton-on-Ayr station) and Mauchline
- Bridge of Weir Railway at Elderslie
- Dalry and North Johnstone Line at Brownhill Junction, north east of Dalry
- Darvel Branch at Hurlford Junction, south east of Kilmarnock
- Glasgow, Barrhead and Kilmarnock Joint Railway at Kilmarnock
- Glasgow, Dumfries and Carlisle Railway at Horsecleugh
- Glasgow, Paisley and Greenock Railway at Paisley Gilmour Street
- Kilmarnock and Troon Railway at Barassie and Kilmarnock
- Paisley Canal Line at Elderslie and at Shields Junction

== Notes ==
=== Sources ===
- Awdry, Christopher (1990). Encyclopaedia of British Railway Companies. Sparkford: Patrick Stephens Ltd. ISBN 1-8526-0049-7. OCLC 19514063. CN 8983.
- British Rail (ScotRail) (1987). "The Rebirth of AyrLine: Electrification to Ayr / Ardrossan / Largs - 1986/1987". British Rail (ScotRail) (hosted by Railwaysarchive.co.uk).
- Butt, R. V. J. (October 1995). The Directory of Railway Stations: details every public and private passenger station, halt, platform and stopping place, past and present (1st ed.). Sparkford: Patrick Stephens Ltd. ISBN 978-1-85260-508-7. OCLC 60251199. OL 11956311M.
- Hurst, Geoffrey (1992). Register of Closed Railways: 1948-1991. Worksop, Nottinghamshire: Milepost Publications. ISBN 0-9477-9618-5.
- Ellis, (Cuthbert) Hamilton (1954). British Railway History: An Outline from the Accession of William IV to the Nationalisation of the Railways. Volume 1: 1830-1876. London: George Allen and Unwin Ltd. OCLC 25208298.
- Ellis, (Cuthbert) Hamilton (1959). British Railway History: An Outline from the Accession of William IV to the Nationalisation of the Railways. Volume 2: 1877-1847. London: George Allen and Unwin Ltd. OCLC 10930826.
- Lewin, Henry Grote (1925). Early British Railways. A short history of their origin & development 1801-1844. London: The Locomotive Publishing Co Ltd. OCLC 11064369.
- Robertson, C. J. A. (1983). The Origins of the Scottish Railway System: 1722-1844 (1st ed.). Edinburgh: John Donald Publishers Ltd. ISBN 0-8597-6088-X.
- Stansfield, G. (1999). Ayrshire & Renfrewshire's Lost Railways. Ochiltree: Stenlake Publishing. ISBN 1-8403-3077-5.
- Stephenson Locomotive Society (1950). The Glasgow and South Western Railway 1850–1923. London: Stephenson Locomotive Society. OCLC 12241057.
- Warden, John (1842). The Glasgow and Ayr and Glasgow and Greenock Railway Companion. Glasgow: John Morrison. OCLC 181873832.
- Wham, Alasdair (1997). The Lost Railway Lines of Ayrshire : Ayrshire Railway Walks. Wigtown: G.C. Book Publishers. ISBN 1-8723-5027-5. OCLC 38356283.
- Whishaw, Francis (1842). The Railways of Great Britain and Ireland Practically Described and Illustrated (2nd ed.). London: John Weale. OCLC 833076248.
