= Drybridge =

Village in North Ayrshire, Scotland

Coordinates: 55°35′41.35″N 4°36′14.6″W

Drybridge is a small village in North Ayrshire, Scotland. Drybridge is thus named because of the "dry bridge" over the Kilmarnock and Troon Railway, opened in 1812. The nearby "wet bridge" is the Laigh Milton Viaduct, the oldest surviving railway bridge in Scotland and possibly the world.

== Standing stone ==
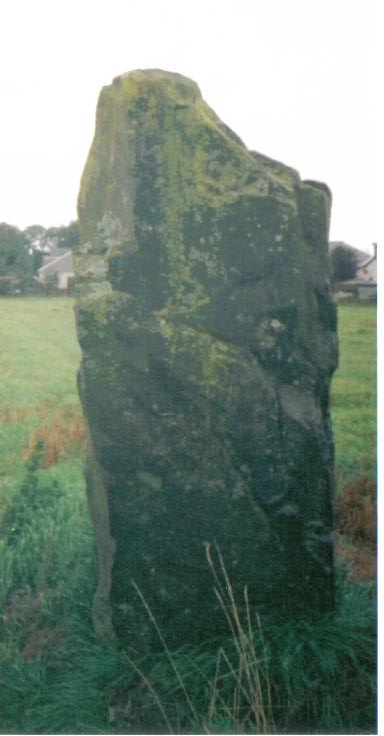
The menhir at Drybridge

The standing stone at Stane Field (NS 359 364), Drybridge, is the only one recorded for this local authority area. It stands close to the old railway station. This standing stone is on level ground in a field of young crop at about 20 m OD. It has a maximum height of 2.6 m, and as stated, is roughly square with a girth of about 4.0 m and a maximum width of 1.3 m. A perforated stone axe head was found nearby. In this area are a cursus, henge, several sites of flint flake deposits and a twin concentric circle structure.

== Facilities ==
The small school stood near the Shewalton East Lodge. It belonged to trustees, but was offered for use by Captain Boyle of Shewalton. The school at Dundonald was overcrowded and the school is opened in 1879 after considerable alterations with Mr. McKissock and Miss Miller as teachers. The school has been demolished having been used as a pallet store for many years.

Shewalton had a 'Mission Station' in 1837, probably at Drybridge and the mother church was Dundonald.

Drybridge is a very basic village with few facilities.a village hall, post box, phone box and recycling facilities. There used to be a school/church here, which spent many years as a pallet makers workshop and store before recently being replaced by houses. The scrap-yard in the old station goods yard is now closed (2008).

The railway which the "dry bridge" carried still exists and is still in use; Drybridge station has been converted into housing. Although the platforms survive, trains no longer stop at Drybridge station.

== Micro-history ==
Shewalton House stood nearby, demolished between the wars and an industrial estate built on part of the estate.
