= Shewalton House and estate =

Coordinates: 55.5979°N 4.6157°W

- Location within North Ayrshire
- OS grid reference: NS3528636925
- Council area: North Ayrshire
- Lieutenancy area: Ayrshire and Arran
- Country: Scotland
- Sovereign state: United Kingdom
- Post town: Irvine
- Police: Scotland
- Fire: Scottish
- Ambulance: Scottish
- Scottish Parliament: Cunninghame North

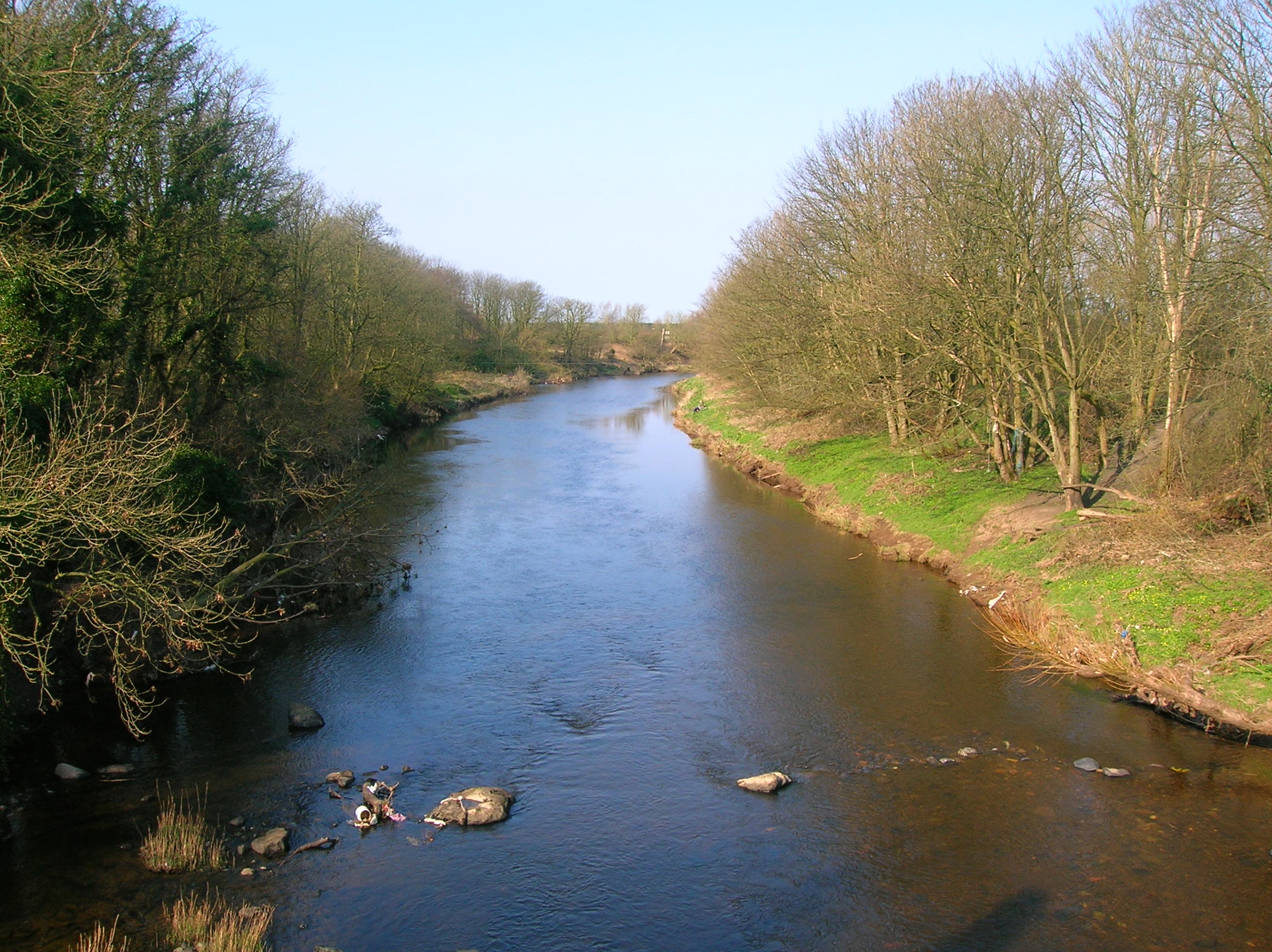
The River Irvine downstream from the site of the old Shewalton House.

Shewalton House and estate were composed of the 'Lands of Shewalton' and the laird's dwelling, originally a tower castle and later a mansion house on the River Irvine in the Shewalton area, two miles from Irvine and west of Drybridge village, East Ayrshire, Dundonald Parish, Scotland. In 1883 the Boyle's estate of Shewalton was 2,358 acres in extent in Ayrshire and was worth at that time £2,708 a year.

== History ==
The lands of Shewalton had been held by the Fullartons of that Ilk and by 1545 they were home to the Wallace family. The Earl of Glasgow later purchased the estate. The tower castle became ruinous and uninhabitable, but stood until the new house was built in 1806. 'Sewalton' was the spelling used in 1473.

=== Shewalton House ===
Colonel John Boyle in 1806 had the mansion house built to a Georgian design, backing onto the River Irvine. The building had a partly subterranean ground floor with two floor above and a rather unusual attic space. Two hipped roofed bays stood on either side of a slightly recessed central bay area, fronted by a solidly simple porch. Another wing was later added to the western aspect of the mansion.

In 1896 the OS map shows a large walled garden, Shewalton Mains Farm and lodges at the end of the East, West and Mid drives. The mansion house had fountains in the gardens on the river facing side and a small summer house was located in an elevated position near the river bank.

A whale skeleton was unearthed in at the water meetings where the Annick Water joins the River Irvine and the ribs were used to form archways in the Shewalton Gardens whilst the vertebrae were used by Irvine weavers as weights on their looms.

George Frederick Boyle (1825–1890) was the 6th Earl of Glasgow and by 1888 he had bankrupted the estate through generous endowment of the Tractarian movement of churches in Scotland, particularly his funding of the Cathedral of The Isles on Great Cumbrae. In 1890 the earldom passed to David Boyle of Shewalton (1833–1915), the earl's cousin, who had decided to sell his own estates, including Shewalton, to buy back the Kelburn Estate which had been put up for auction.

OS maps show that the mansion house had been demolished by 1958 and the main remaining estate feature was the walled garden, all three lodges having also been demolished as had the old school building next to the east lodge. Shewalton Lodge and Tanglewood are two properties now (2014) located within the old estate grounds.

=== The Lairds of Shewalton ===
==== Fullartons and Wallaces ====
Lambert Wallace in 1473 held the lands under John de Fullarton of that Ilk and the family were in possession of the lands until 1715. John Wallace of Sewalton (sic) is recorded in 1583, Edward Wallace in 1586, William Wallace in 1595, David Wallace in 1615. Edward Wallace sold Shewalton, Marress near Irvine, and Waxford to William Boyle in 1715. This William Boyle was the brother of David, first Earl of Glasgow.

==== Boyles ====
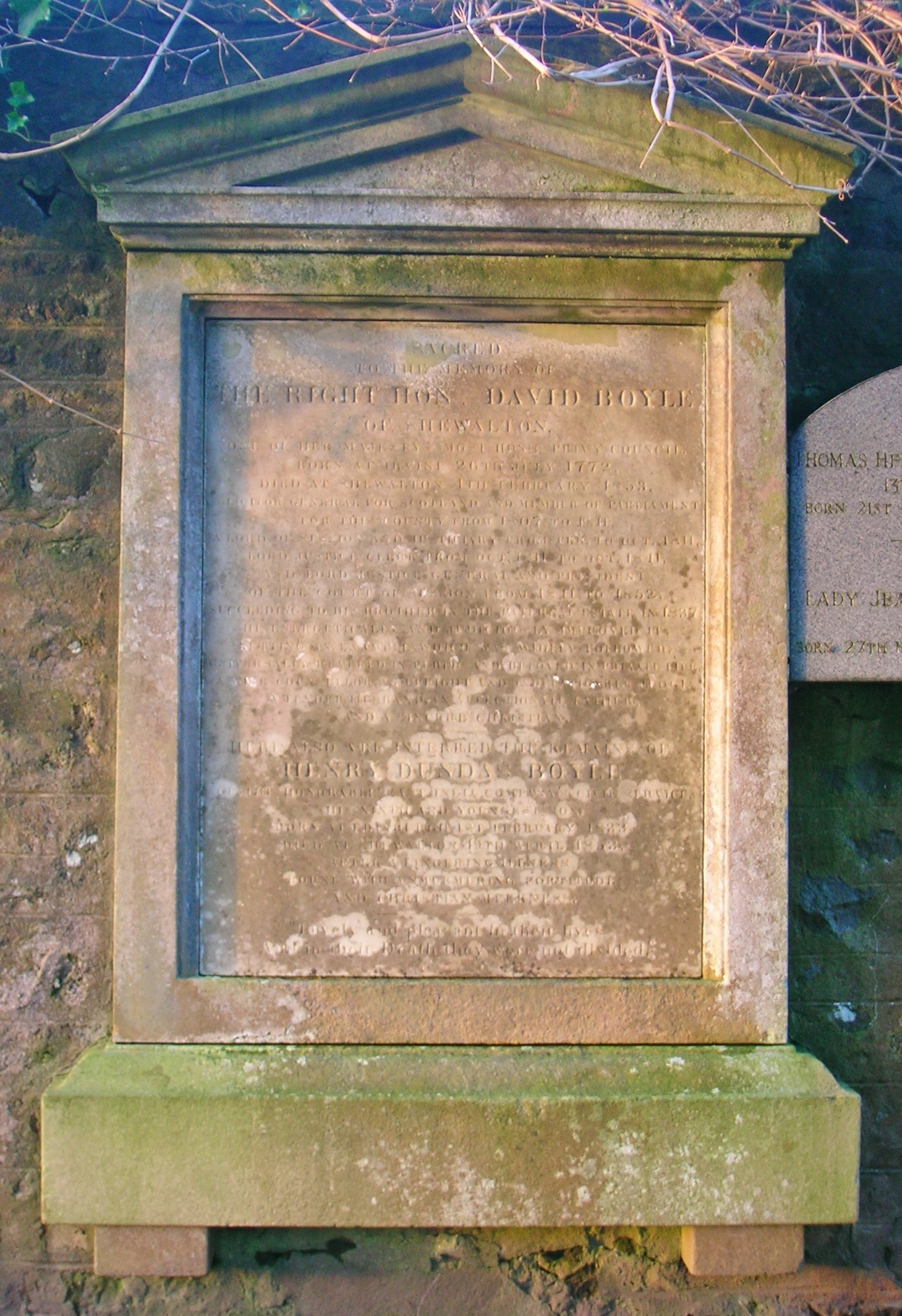
Memorial at Dundonald Church to David Boyle.

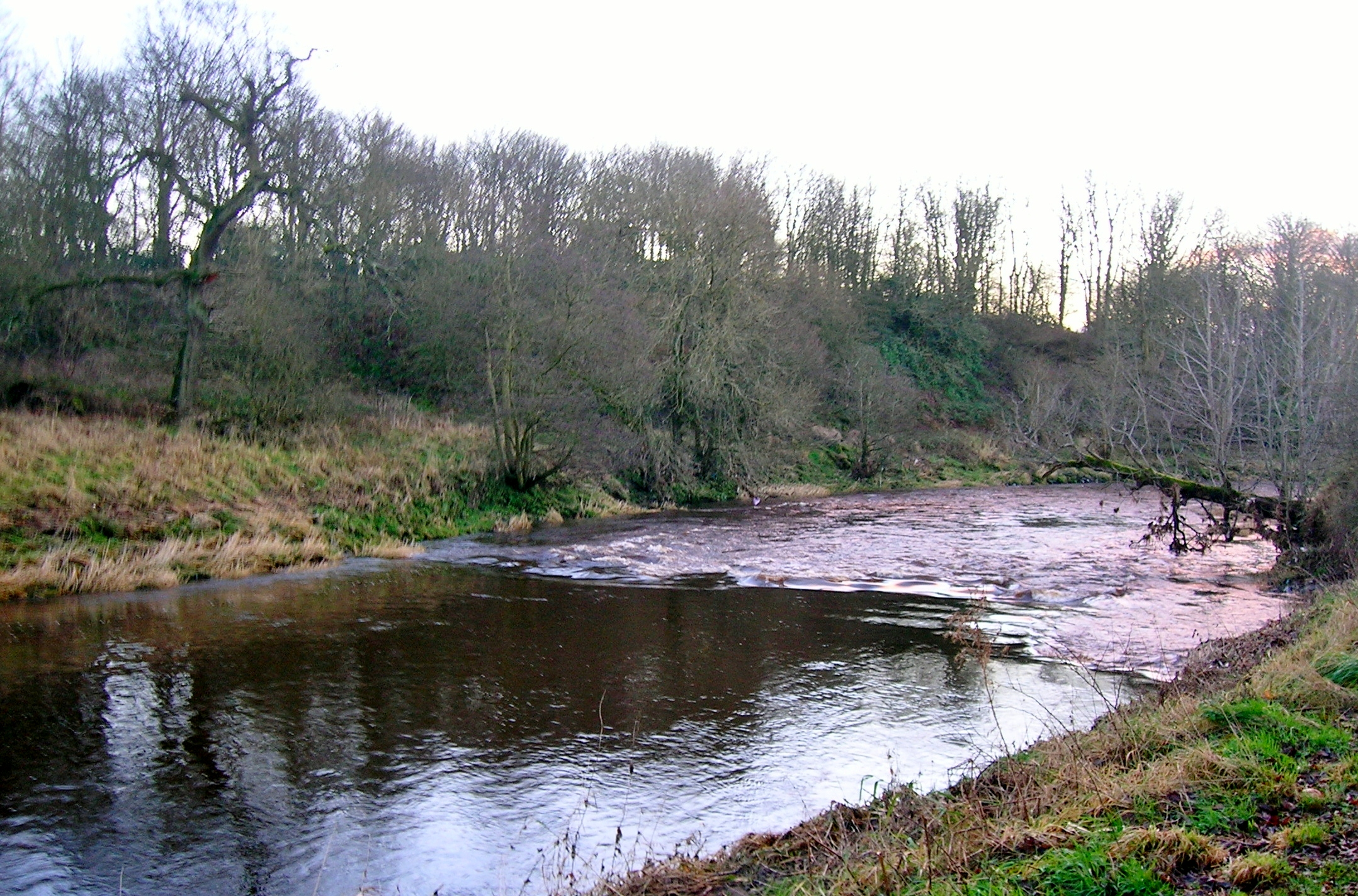
The Irvine below the site of an old Summer House and the mansion house.

Patrick Boyle, born in 1690, was raised to the bench as Lord Shewalton in 1746, was son of David, the first Earl of Glasgow. He died in 1761. The Hon. Patrick Boyle, second son of the second Earl of Glasgow, born on 22 July 1771, inherited the estate and died in 1798. In 1837, Colonel of the Ayrshire Militia, John Boyle, died and David Boyle, his only surviving brother, inherited.

David Boyle was born in 1772, was twice married and was M.P. for Ayrshire in 1793, Lord Justice-General of Scotland and Lord President of the Court Session in 1841. He died on 4 February 1853 and was buried at Shewalton, however a memorial to him resides at the family burial plot in Dundonald Church (See photograph). In 1865 a statue of Boyle was erected in Irvine and now stands in Castle Street after being moved from the east end of the town's High Street. He had adopted the designation 'of Shewalton', having formerly held the designation 'of Marress'. David was the presiding judge and sentenced the murderers Burke and Hare. He was said to have had "some of the greatest judicial imperfections and some of the greatest judicial excellencies, to be of untiring industry, perfect candour, and held the principles of a gentleman, and a very sensitive conscience, with a heart resolute in honesty."

Patrick Boyle inherited Shewalton from his father in 1853 and when he died in 1874 his son Captain David Boyle, R.N. inherited, becoming a Lieutenant of Ayrshire and later Convenor of the County of Ayr. In October 1789 Patrick's wife and children travelled down to Bath and details of their journey via the Brownhill Inn, etc. survive as letters to Patrick.

The family crest was an eagle, displayed, with two heads and the family motto was 'Dominus providebit', 'The Lord Will Provide'.

=== Kenneths ===
In 1865 Shewalton House was the property of a Messrs. Archibald Kenneth and Sons, Dreghorn, who owned the nearby Montgomeryfield and other coal pits in Ayrshire.

== The Shewalton area ==
=== Archaeology ===
A number of prehistoric artifacts have been found on Shewalton Moor, including an urn, ornamented hand-made pottery, flint scrapers, drills, and arrowheads of several different designs. So many polishers were found at one site that a workshop and prehistoric village location have been suggested. A saddle-quern and a spindle-whorl have also been found, together with beads and hammer stones.

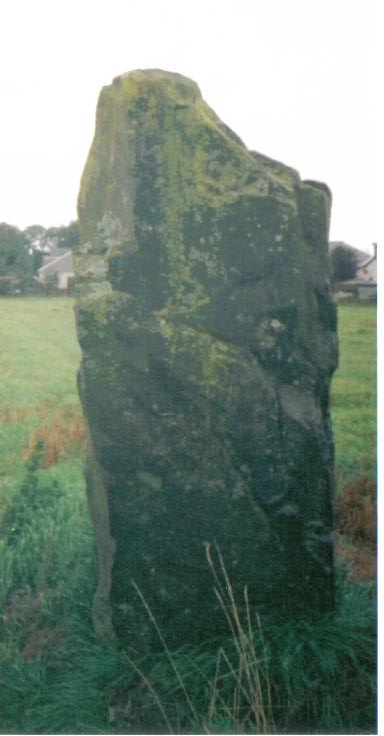
The menhir at Drybridge

The standing stone at Stane Field (NS 359 364), Drybridge, is the only one recorded in mainland North Ayrshire. It stands close to the old railway station on level ground in a field. It has a maximum height of 2.6 m, and is roughly square with a girth of about 4.0 m and a maximum width of 1.3 m. A perforated stone axe head was found nearby.

=== Shewalton Mill ===
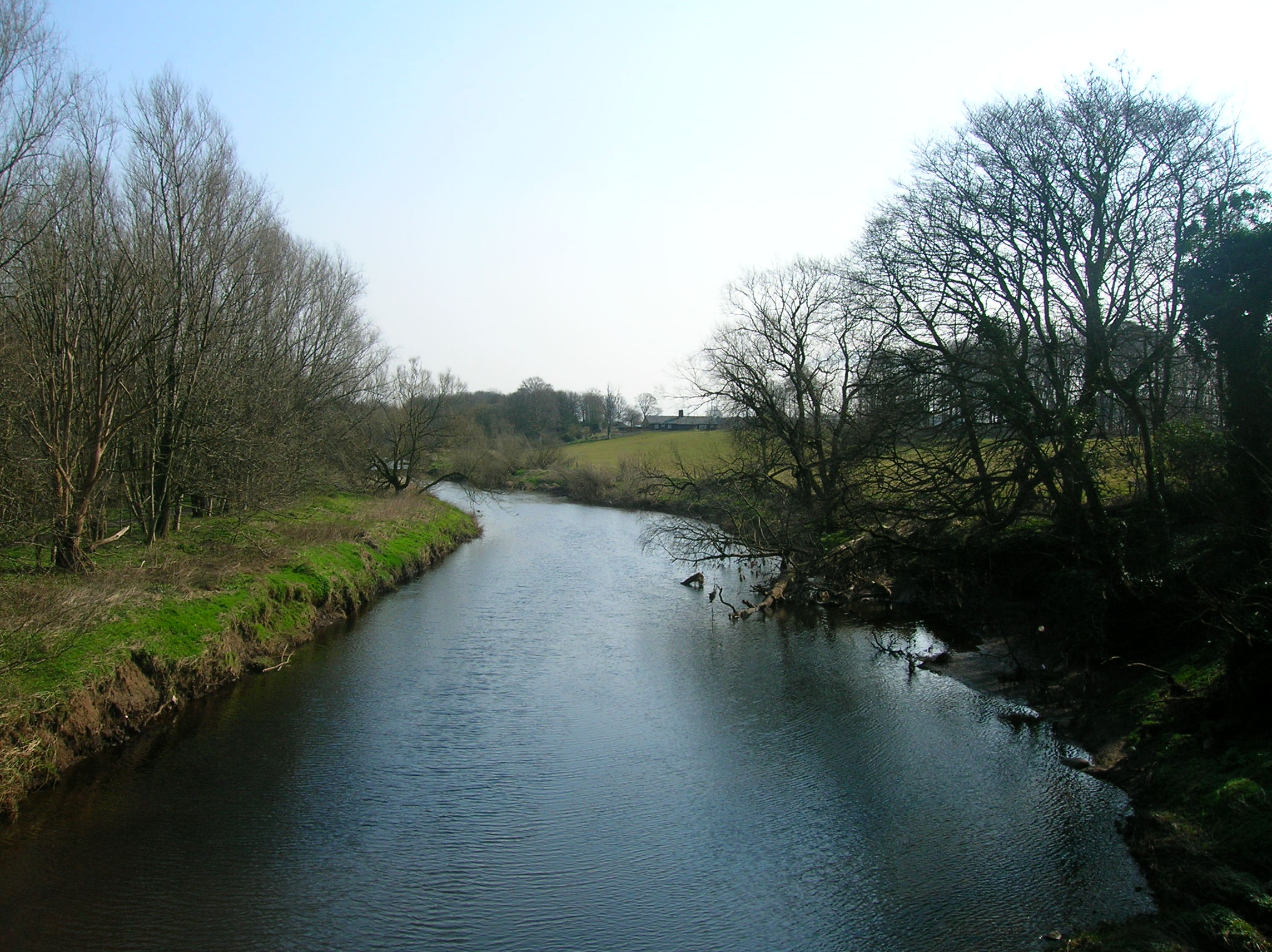
Looking upstream towards the site of Shewalton House.

Shewalton Mill was a corn mill on the River Irvine, first recorded in the 17th century and shown with a weir across the river in the 19th century, but is now a total ruin with only remnants of the weir surviving (datum 2012). John Cullen, buried at Dundonald, was one of the millers at Shewalton and died in 1797 aged 59.

The two storey mill at Shewalton was operated via a sluice in the substantial weir and it had two waterwheels; unusually these were both fully enclosed and slate roofed. A lade ran from the sluice to rejoin the river resulting in a long and thin island bordering the river.

A glacial erratic boulder in the old mill yard survives in situ and is recorded on OS maps, used it seems as a loupin on stane.

=== Coal mining ===
Coal mining provided employment on a large scale in North Ayrshire from early in the 19th century. Coal pits were opened at this time in Shewalton, Fairlie, Peatland, Templeton, and Fortacres. A colliery was located near the west lodge with a mineral railway line shown as crossing the river at this point in 1925. A. Kenneth and Sons's Shewalton collieries 3 and 4 were at Drybridge, opening in 1924 to produce house coal, employing around 180 miners until closure in 1955. The two colliery shafts were 132m deep and the extracted coal was taken to Montgomeryfield screening plant and washer.

Shewalton Collieries 5 and 6 opened in 1933 and closed in 1950 with a workforce of around 150, mining house coal, which was also taken to the Montgomeryfield screening plant and washer.

=== Drybridge School ===
As stated, the small school once stood near the Shewalton East Lodge. It belonged to trustees of the Shewalton Estate, but was offered for use by Captain Boyle of Shewalton. The school at Dundonald was overcrowded and Drybridge School was opened in 1879 after considerable alterations with Mr. McKissock and Miss Miller as teachers.

=== Transport ===
The Kilmarnock and Troon Railway opened in 1812 and ran near to Shewalton House. Drybridge railway station lay close by on the route of the old line from Kilmarnock to Troon. Shewalton Road runs through the area. The Earl of Eglinton was a shareholder in the Kilmarnock and Troon Railway, with the Duke of Portland who was the majority holder and Captain Boyle who had a single share, but therefore still a joint owner as the railway company was only the leaseholder.

=== Micro-history ===
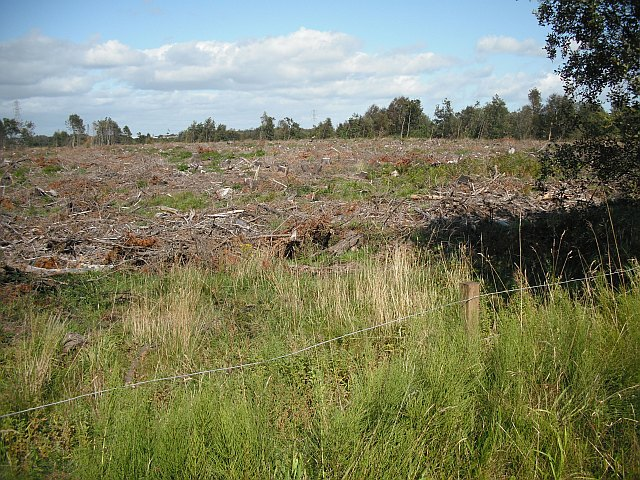
Shewalton Wood.

The Caledonian Pulp Mill is located on the western margin of Shewalton Moss. It was opened in 1989 by Prince Philip, Duke of Edinburgh. The factory produces glossy paper for magazines and other publications, using china clay brought in by train from Cornwall. After Shewalton House was demolished a ball bearing factory was built nearby and the industrial estate also built here occupies part of the old estate's deer park.

Johnson's 1828 map gives the name 'Paulston' for a dwelling on Shewalton Road and the 'stone' or menhir is both shown and named as such.

GlaxoSmithKline have a large factory nearby on Shewalton Road that manufactures prescription products.

Shewalton Woods, Shewalton Sand Pits, Oldhall Ponds and the nearby Trocol Pond are Scottish Wildlife Trust nature reserves.

Extensive sand and gravel extraction has taken place within the Shewalton area leaving flooded quarries and areas used by North Ayrshire Council for disposing of certain categories of household waste.

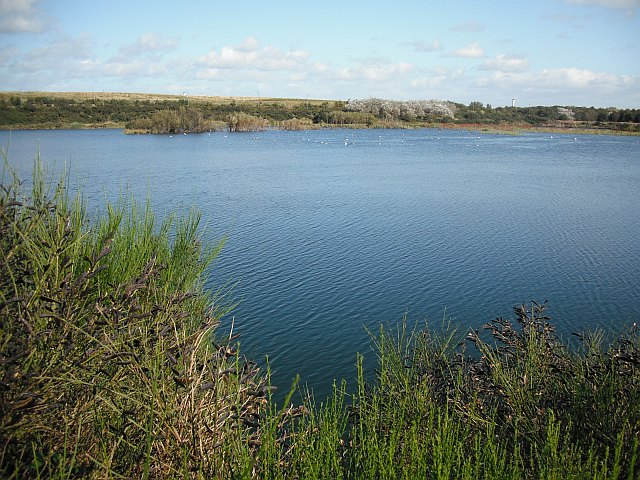
Flooded sand and gravel quarry at Shewalton.

== See also ==
- David Boyle, Lord Boyle
