= Gatehead railway station =

Former railway station in Scotland

Gatehead
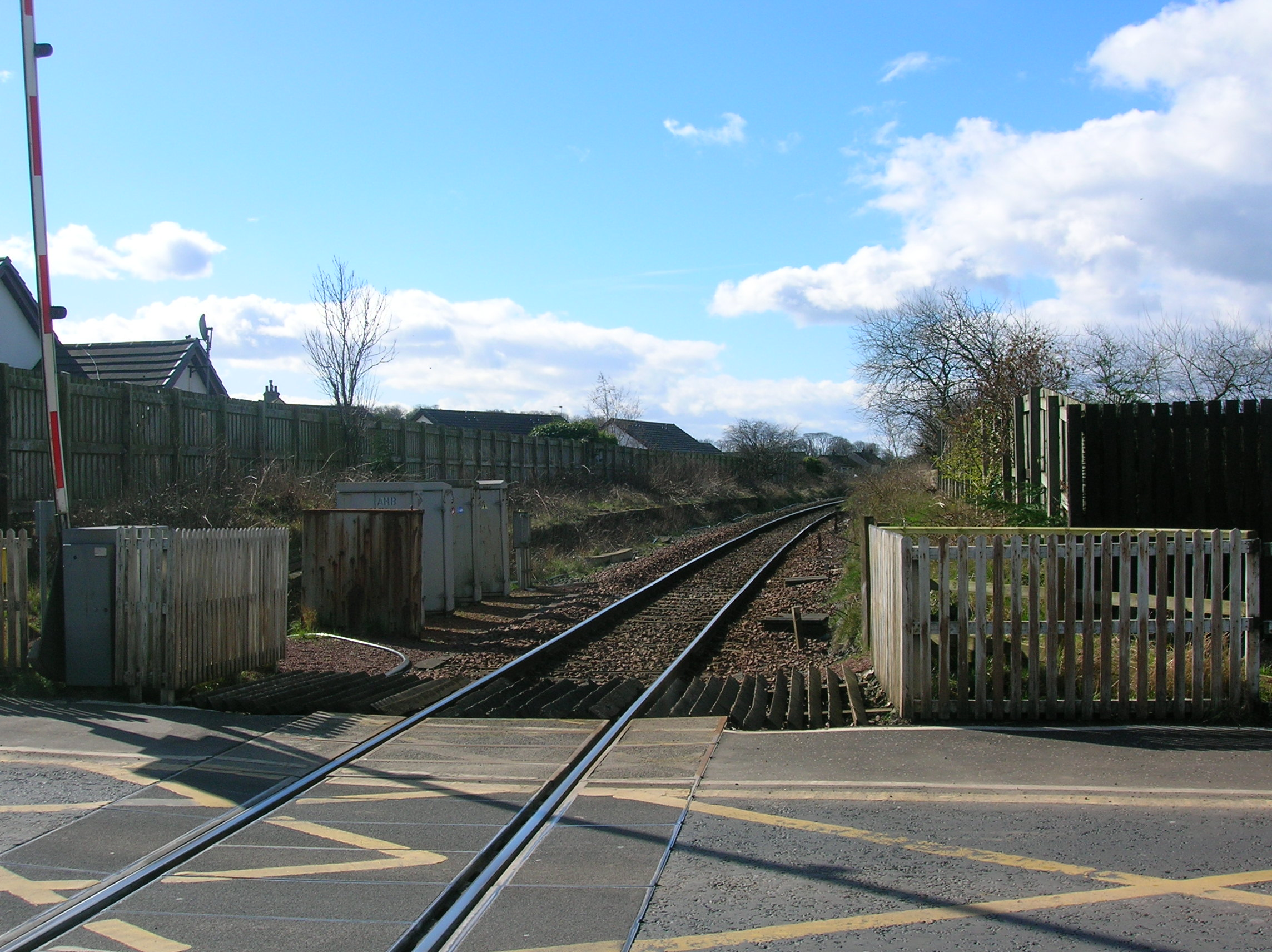
- The remains of the station platform in early 2007

General information
- Location: Gatehead, Ayrshire; Scotland
- Coordinates: 55.5943°N 4.5547°W
- Grid reference: NS390363
- Platforms: 2

Other information
- Status: Disused

History
- Original company: Kilmarnock and Troon Railway
- Pre-grouping: Glasgow and South Western Railway
- Post-grouping: London, Midland and Scottish Railway

Key dates
- 6 July 1812: Opened
- 3 March 1969: Closed
Location

Gatehead railway station was a railway station serving the village of Gatehead, East Ayrshire, Scotland.

== History ==
The station was opened on 6 July 1812 by the Kilmarnock and Troon Railway. The Glasgow, Paisley, Kilmarnock and Ayr Railway took over management of the station (and its line) on 16 July 1846, while its successor, the Glasgow and South Western Railway, took over full ownership in 1899. The station closed on 3 March 1969.

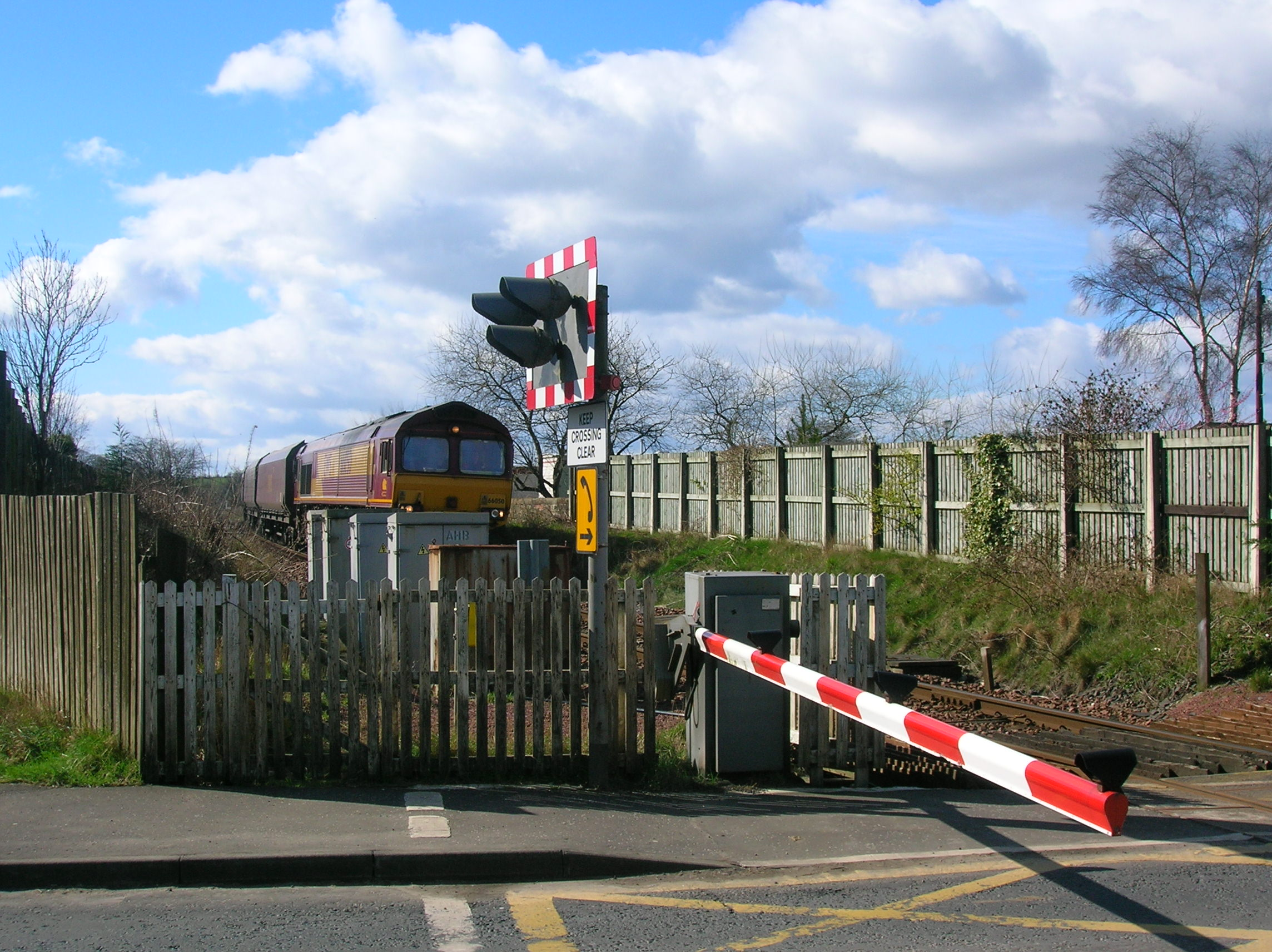
A coal train from the 'Troon' end of the line

Today Gatehead station has a single platform intact (although overgrown). The line is still open as part of the Glasgow South Western Line and the station's level crossing is still in use, allowing road traffic on the A759 to cross the line.

Laigh Milton Viaduct, Scotland's oldest railway viaduct, is nearby, but not in use as the railway was realigned in 1846.

| Preceding station | Historical railways | Following station |
|---|---|---|
| Drybridge; Line open; station closed | Glasgow and South Western Railway; Kilmarnock and Troon Railway | Kilmarnock (1); 1812 - 1843 |
| Drybridge; Line open; station closed | Glasgow and South Western Railway; Kilmarnock and Troon Railway | Kilmarnock (2); 1843 - 1846 |
| Drybridge; Line open; station closed | Glasgow and South Western Railway; Kilmarnock and Troon Railway | Kilmarnock (3); 1846 - 1969 |
| Connection with K&TR | Glasgow and South Western Railway; Gatehead and Hurlford Branch | Riccarton; Line and station closed |

== Views of the railway at Gatehead ==
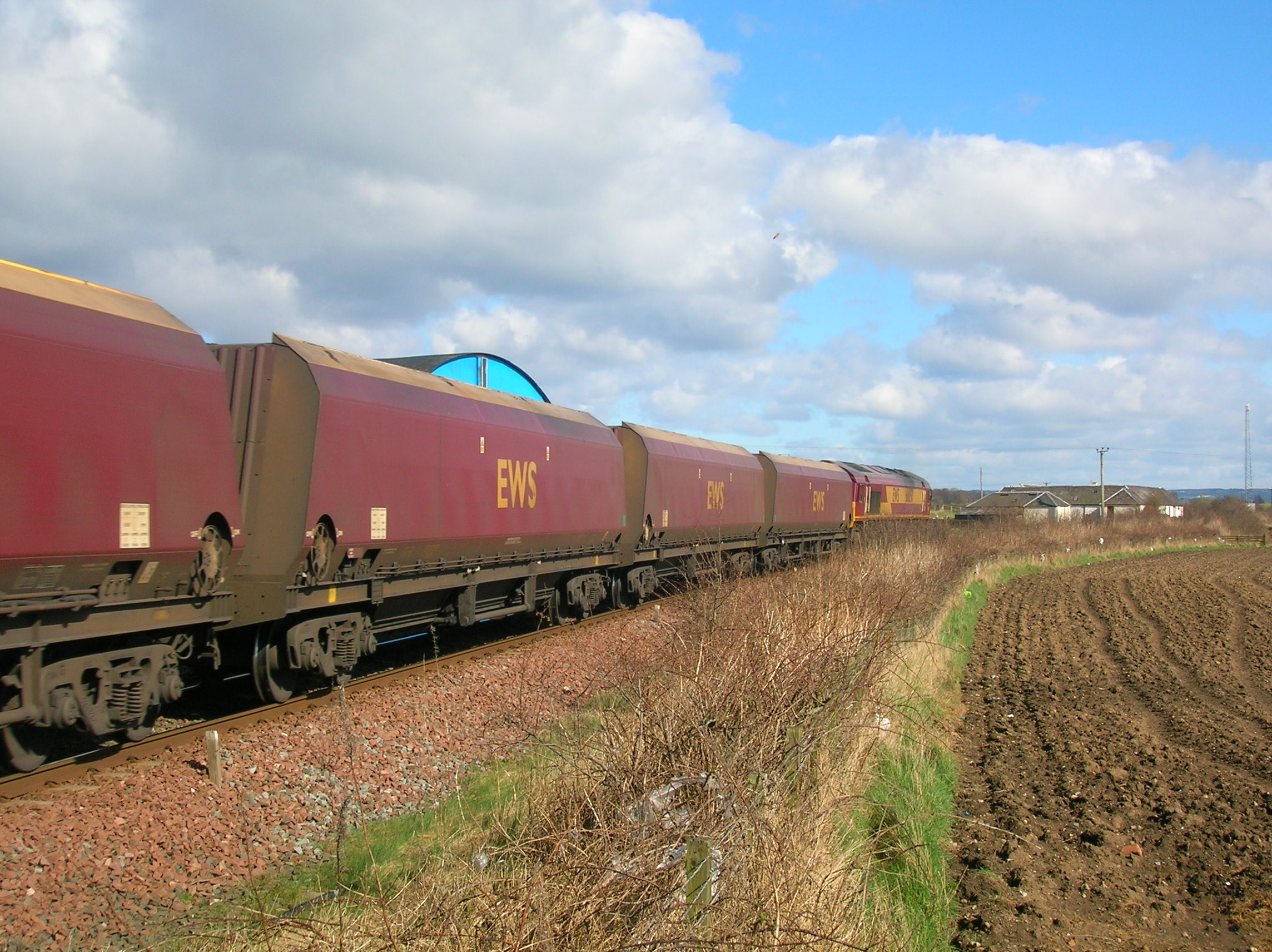
A coal train heading up to Kilmarnock

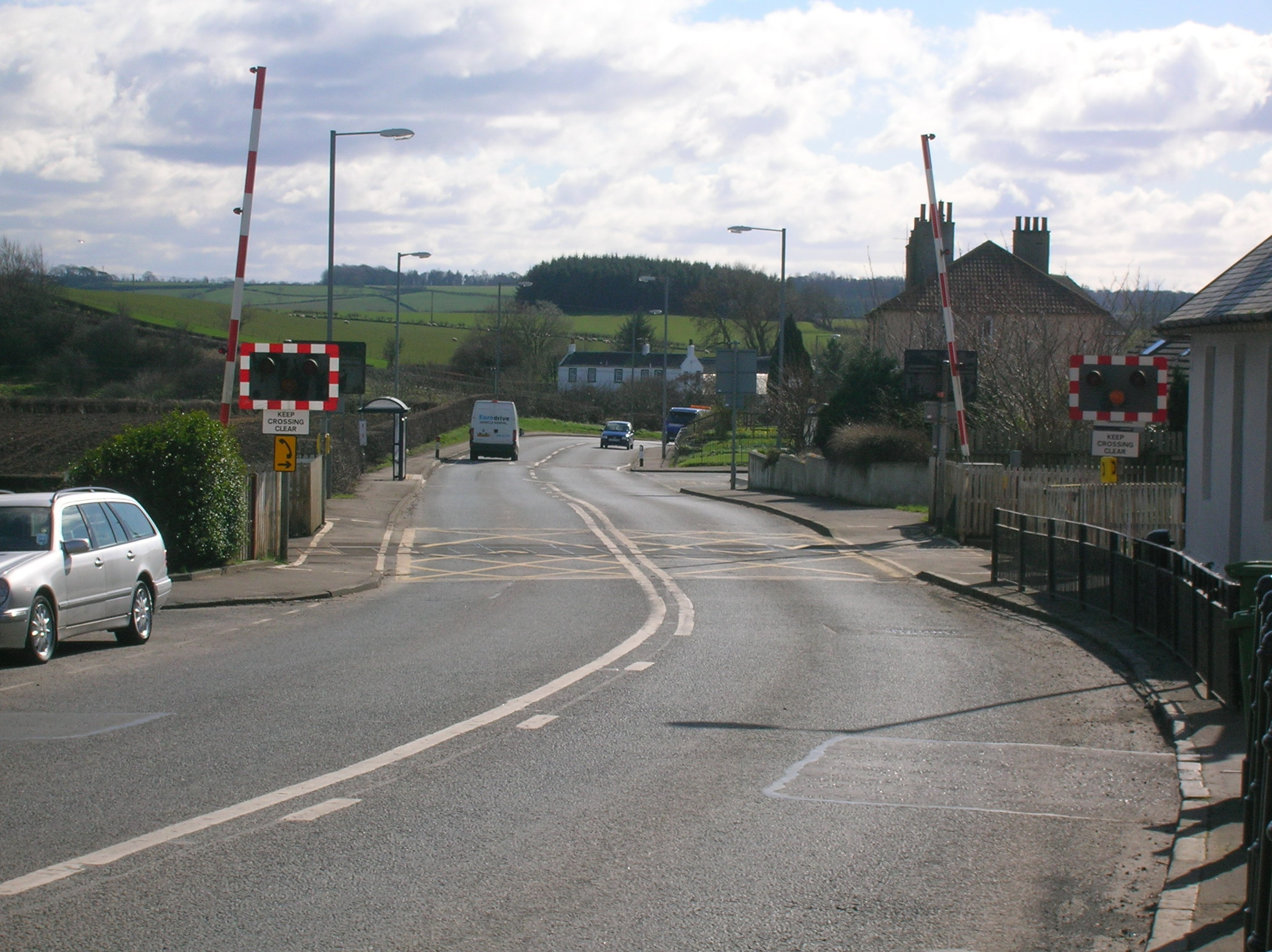
Looking towards the River Irvine and Old Rome

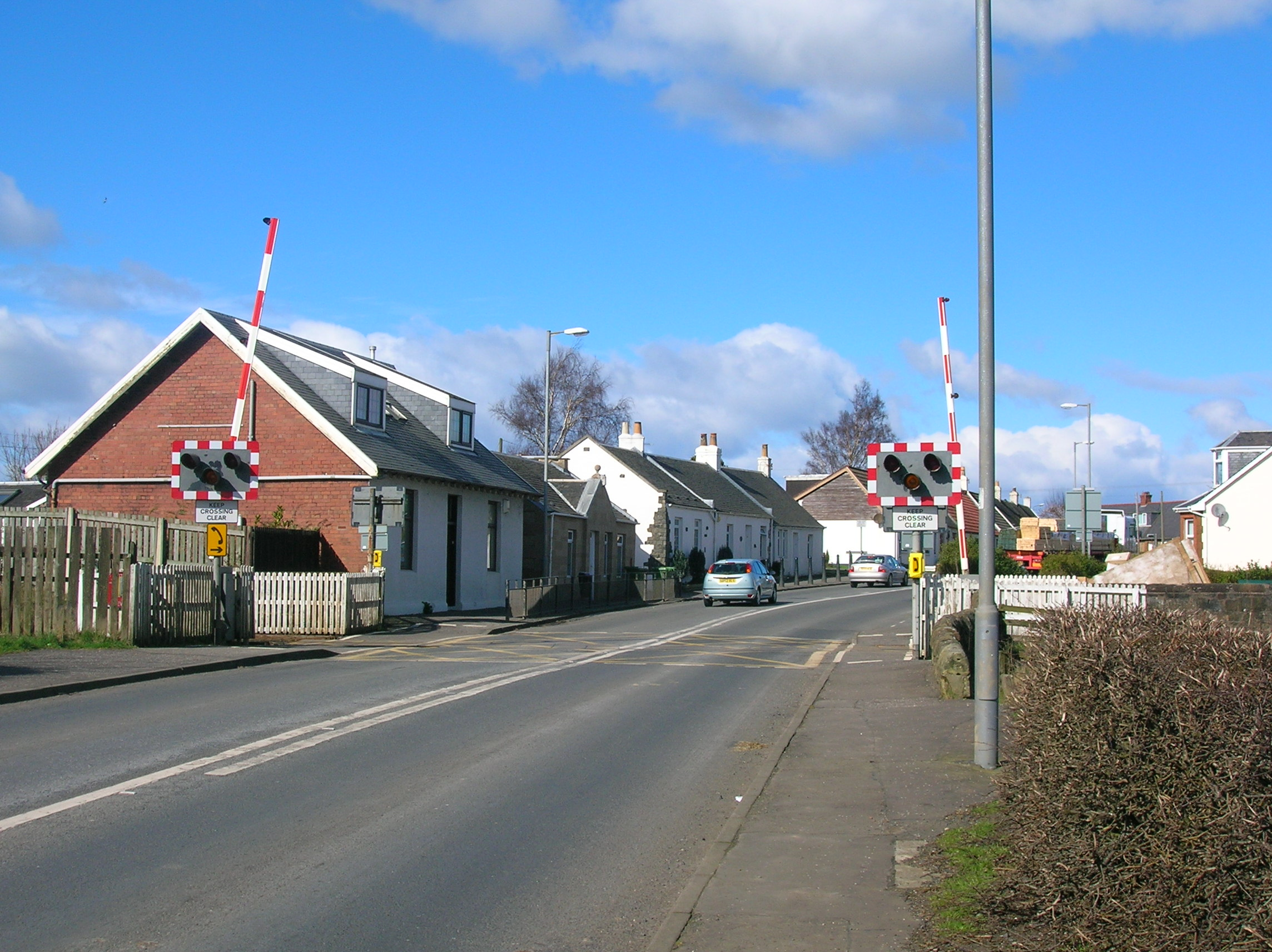
Looking towards the Cochrane Inn and Crosshouse
