= Drybridge railway station =

Railway station in Scotland

Drybridge
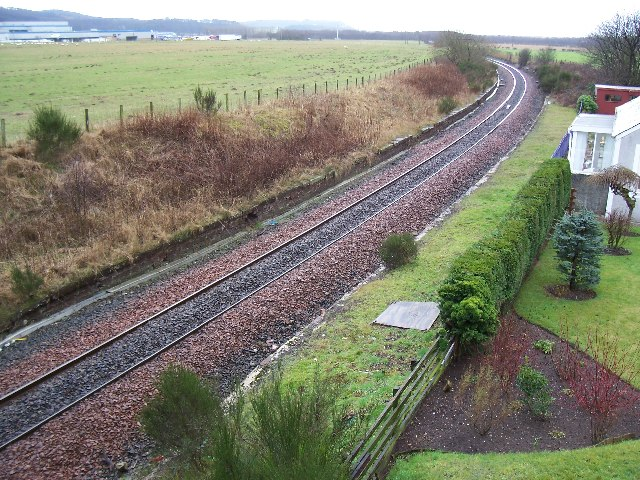
- Drybridge station in early 2006

General information
- Location: Drybridge, Ayrshire; Scotland
- Coordinates: 55.5940°N 4.6037°W
- Grid reference: NS359364
- Platforms: 2

Other information
- Status: Disused

History
- Original company: Kilmarnock and Troon Railway
- Pre-grouping: Glasgow and South Western Railway
- Post-grouping: London, Midland and Scottish Railway

Key dates
- 6 July 1812: Opened
- 3 March 1969: Closed
Location

Drybridge railway station was a railway station serving the village of Drybridge, North Ayrshire, Scotland.

== History ==
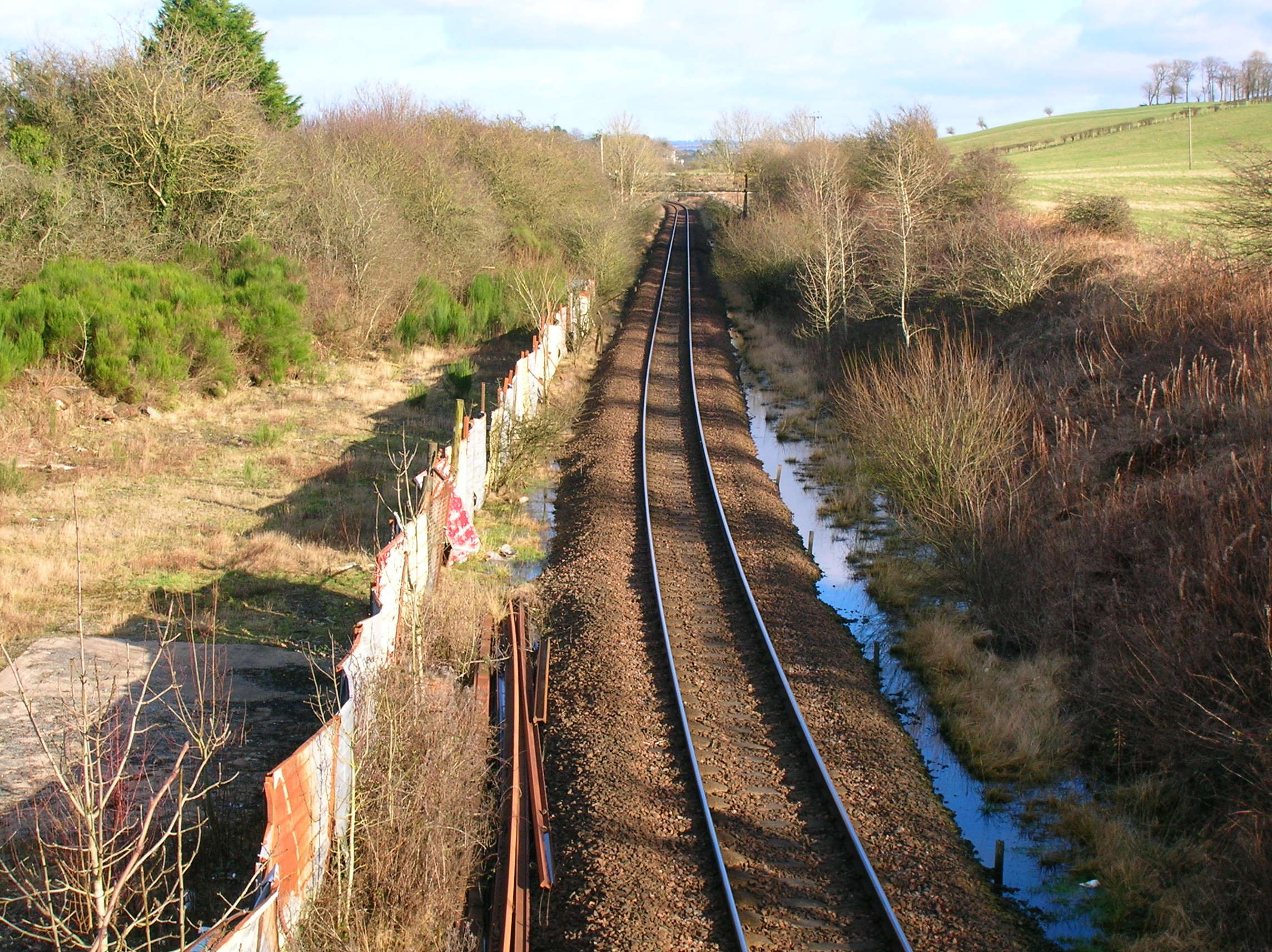
The site of the old goods yard.

The station was opened on 6 July 1812 by the Kilmarnock and Troon Railway. The Glasgow, Paisley, Kilmarnock and Ayr Railway took over management of the station on 16 July 1846, while its successor, the Glasgow and South Western Railway, took over full ownership in 1899. The station closed on 3 March 1969.

The station named 'Drybridge' in Moray was renamed 'Letterfourie' by the London, Midland and Scottish Railway who had acquired both stations.

Today Drybridge station has its platforms intact (although overgrown), and the station building is now a private residence. The line is still open as the 'Burns Line', part of the Glasgow South Western Line.

The village of 'Drybridge' is so named after the fact that most bridges up until the era of the railways were built over watercourses and were therefore 'wet bridges'; a name applied to the nearby Laigh Milton Viaduct.

Visible from the station is the only surviving standing stone on the mainland in North Ayrshire.

| Preceding station | Historical railways | Following station |
|---|---|---|
| Barassie; Line and station open | Glasgow and South Western Railway; Kilmarnock and Troon Railway | Gatehead; Line open; station closed |
