= Ayr (disambiguation) =

Ayr is a town in south-west Scotland in the county of Ayrshire.

Ayr or AYR may also refer to:

== People ==
- Ayr (clan), a sub-clan of the Somali Hawiye clan
- Ivan Ayr, film director
- Nicolás Ayr (born 1982) Argentine soccer player

== Places ==
=== Australia ===
- Ayr, Queensland, a town in Australia
  - Shire of Ayr, a former local government area in Queensland, Australia, containing Ayr

=== Canada ===
- Ayr, Ontario, a village in Canada

=== United Kingdom ===
- Ayrshire, a county in Scotland, Chapman code AYR
- Point of Ayr, the northernmost point of mainland Wales
- River Ayr, a river in Ayrshire, Scotland

=== United States ===
- Ayr, Nebraska, a village in the U.S.
- Ayr, North Dakota, a village in the U.S.
- Ayr Township, Adams County, Nebraska, a township in the U.S.
- Ayr Township, North Dakota, a township in the U.S.
- Ayr Township, Pennsylvania, a township in the U.S.

=== Elsewhere ===
- Ayr (crater), on Mars
- Ayr, Iran, a village in Markazi Province, Iran
- Ayr Mountains, Kazakhstan

== Government ==
- Ayr (Scottish Parliament constituency), a constituency of the Scottish Parliament (Holyrood)
- Ayr (Parliament of Scotland constituency) a constituency of the Parliament of Scotland prior to 1707
- Ayr (UK Parliament constituency), a constituency of the House of Commons of the Parliament of the United Kingdom from 1950 to 2005

== Schools ==
- Ayr State High School, Ayr, Queensland, Australia; a secondary school and heritage site
- Ayr College, Ayr, Ayrshire, Scotland, UK; a former college and now campus of Ayrshire College
- Ayr Academy, Ayr, Ayrshire, Scotland, UK; a secondary school

== Sports ==
- Ayr Racecourse, Ayr, Ayrshire, Scotland, UK; a horse racing track
- Ayr RFC, Ayr, Ayrshire, Scotland, UK; a rugby union team
- Ayr United F.C., Ayr, Ayrshire, Scotland, UK; a soccer team
- Ayr F.C., Ayr, Ayrshire, Scotland, UK; a soccer team

== Transportation ==
- Ayr railway station, Queensland, Australia
- Ayr railway station, Ayr, Ayrshire, Scotland, UK; current rail station
- Ayr railway station (1839–1857), Ayr, Ayrshire, Scotland, UK; former rail station
- Ayr railway station (1856-1886), Ayr, Ayrshire, Scotland, UK; a former rail station replaced by Ayr railway station
- English Electric Ayr, British 3-seat coastal patrol plane

== Other ==
- 2nd (Ayr) Ayrshire Artillery Volunteer Corps, of the British Army
- Alegrijes y Rebujos (AyR), a children's telenovela
- AYR (sidecarcross), an Estonian manufacturer of sidecarcross frames
- AYR (brand), contemporary women’s clothing company
- Aymara language (ISO 639 code: ayr)

== See also ==
- Ayr (constituency)
- Ayr County (disambiguation)
- Ayr Hospital (disambiguation)
- Ayr station (disambiguation)
- Ayr Township (disambiguation)
- Ayre (disambiguation)
- Ayres (disambiguation)
- Ayrshire (disambiguation)
- Mount Ayr (disambiguation)
- Aïr
