= Ayr station =

Ayr station may refer to:

== Rail ==
- Ayr railway station, Queensland, Australia
- Ayr TMD, Ayr, Ayrshire, Scotland, UK; a rail depot
- Ayr railway station (est. 1886), Ayr, Ayrshire, Scotland, UK; current rail station
- Ayr railway station (1839–1857), Ayr, Ayrshire, Scotland, UK; former rail station
- Ayr railway station (1856–1886), Ayr, Ayrshire, Scotland, UK; a former rail station replaced by Ayr railway station
- Newton-on-Ayr railway station, Ayr, Ayrshire, Scotland, UK
- Heads of Ayr railway station, South Ayrshire, Ayrshire, Scotland, UK; a former rail station
- Heads of Ayr Holiday Camp railway station, South Ayrshire, Ayrshire, Scotland, UK; a former rail station

== Other uses ==
- STV Ayr, Ayr, Queensland, Australia; a TV station

== See also ==
- Ayr (disambiguation)
