= Aire =

Aire may refer to:

== Music ==
- Aire, a song on the album Chicago VII by the group Chicago (band), 1974
- Aire (Yuri album), 1987
- Aire (Pablo Ruiz album), 1997
- Aire (Versión Día), an album by Jesse & Joy

== Places ==
- Aire-sur-la-Lys, a town in the Pas-de-Calais département in France
- Aire-la-Ville, a municipality in the Canton of Geneva, in Switzerland
- Aire-sur-l'Adour, a town of Aquitaine, in the Landes département
  - Roman Catholic Diocese of Aire
- Aire, Ardennes, a commune in the Ardennes département in France
- Aïre, a small commune in Geneva, Switzerland
- Illa de l'Aire, island in the Balearics

== Rivers ==
- River Aire, a river in Yorkshire, England
- Aire (Aisne), a river in the Ardennes département, northern France
- Aire (Arve), a tributary of the Arve in the canton of Geneva, in Switzerland
- Aire River (Victoria), a river in Australia

== People ==
- Aire Koop (born 1957), Estonian actress
- Aire Lepik, Estonian footballer
- Aire Webster, son of Kylie Jenner and Travis Scott

== Other ==
- Autoimmune regulator (AIRE), a human gene that is expressed in the thymus
- Advice on Individual Rights in Europe (AIRE), a London-based charity
- Aire de service, a rest area/service station in France or in Quebec
- Mount Aire, a mountain in Utah, US
- The Siege of Aire (1710), a military action in the War of the Spanish Succession
- SS Aire, a steamship launched in 1886

== See also ==
- Air (disambiguation)
- Airedale (disambiguation)
- Ayre (disambiguation)
