= Ayr railway =

Ayr railway may refer to:

- Ayr to Mauchline Branch; in Scotland
- Ayr and Dalmellington Railway; in Scotland
- Ayr and Maybole Junction Railway; in Scotland
- Glasgow, Paisley, Kilmarnock and Ayr Railway; in Scotland
- Ayr Corporation Tramways; streetcar line in Scotland

== See also ==
- Ayr (disambiguation)
- Ayr station (disambiguation)
