= Ayres (surname) =

Ayres is a surname that has origins in the Scottish borderland with England. Notable people with the surname include:

- Agnes Ayres (1898–1940), American silent film actor
- Alice Ayres (1859–1885), English nursemaid, honored for rescuing her three nieces from a burning building at the cost of her own life
- Anne Ayres (1816–1886), American Episcopalian nun
- Benjamin Ayres (born 1977) an actor, director, photographer
- Benjamin Ayres (instrument maker) (died c. 1775), an English instrument maker
- Bill Ayres (1941–2026), American radio talk show host, co-founder and executive director of World Hunger Year
- Carlos Augusto Ayres de Freitas Britto (born 1942), a Brazilian jurist and was a Justice of the Supreme Federal Court of Brazil.
- Caroline Ayres (born 1981), English basketball player
- Christopher Ayres (1965–2021), American voice actor
- Clara Ayres (1880–1917), American nurse during the First World War
- Clarence Edwin Ayres (1891–1972), American economist
- David Ayres (born 1977), Canadian ice hockey goaltender
- David Ayres (soldier) (1841–1916), Union Army Medal of Honor recipient
- Ed Ayres (disambiguation), multiple people
- Gary Ayres (born 1960), Australian rules footballer and coach
- Gillian Ayres (1930–2018), British painter
- Greg Ayres (born 1968), American voice actor
- Harry Ayres (footballer) (1920–2002), British footballer
- Harry Ayres (mountaineer) (1912–1987), New Zealand guide and mountaineer
- Helen Ayres, Australian violinist, member of the Seraphim Trio
- Ian Ayres (born 1959), American professor at Yale Law School and Yale School of Management
- Ian Ayres (filmmaker), American filmmaker
- João Maria Correia Ayres de Campos, 1st Count of Ameal (1847–1920), Portuguese humanist, politician and art-collector
- José Márcio Ayres (1954–2003), Brazilian primatologist and conservationist
- Leonard Porter Ayres (1879–1946), American statistician
- Lew Ayres (1908–1996), American actor
- Lewis Ayres, lay Catholic theologian
- Mark Ayres (born 1961), British electronic musician, composer & audio engineer
- Nita Jane Ayres, American politician
- Pam Ayres (born 1947), British writer of humorous poetry
- Philip Ayres (poet) (1638–1712), English poet
- Philip Burnard Ayres (1813–1863), British physician and botanist
- Richard Ayres (born 1965), British composer
- Robert Ayres (disambiguation), multiple people
- Romeyn B. Ayres (1825–1888), Union general in the American Civil War
- Rosalind Ayres (born 1946), British actress
- Stuart Ayres (born 1980), Australian politician
- Sydney Ayres (1879–1916), American silent film actor and director
- Thomas Ayres (artist) (1816–1858), California gold rush-era artist
- Thomas Ayres (ornithologist) (1828–1913), British-born South African ornithologist
- Thomas E. Ayres (born 1962), American military lawyer
- Tim Ayres (born 1973), Australian politician and trade unionist
- Tim Ayres (artist), born in England
- Venâncio de Oliveira Ayres (1841–1885) Brazilian Journalist
- Vernon Ayres (1908–1968), Canadian ice hockey player
- Vivian Ayres (born 1972), Peruvian football player and manager
- William Orville Ayres (1817–1887), American physician and ichthyologist

== See also ==
- Edward L. Ayers, American historian and educator
- Sir Henry Ayers (1821–1897), South Australian premier

- Ayers Rock, named for him (now Uluru)
