= Airedale (disambiguation) =

Airedale is the valley of the River Aire in Yorkshire, England.

Airedale may also refer to

- Airedale Terrier, a breed of dog

Places

- Airedale, Castleford, a suburb of Castleford, West Yorkshire, England
- Airedale, Kentucky, a community in the United States

People

- Baron Airedale, a title in the British peerage

Transport

- Airedale (automobile)
- Beagle Airedale, a British aircraft developed in the 1960s
- Blackburn Airedale, a British aircraft built in 1924
- Airedale Line, a rail service

Other

- Airedale Academy, a school in Castleford, West Yorkshire, England
- Airedale General Hospital, West Yorkshire, England
- Airedale NHS Foundation Trust, a National Health Service Hospital Trust in West Yorkshire
