= Ayrshire (disambiguation) =

Ayrshire is a registration county, and former administrative county in south-west Scotland, United Kingdom.

Ayrshire or Ayrshires may also refer to:

== Places ==
=== United Kingdom ===
- Ayrshire (constituency), a list of places in the United Kingdom
- Ayrshire (UK Parliament constituency), a county constituency of the House of Commons of the Parliaments of Great Britain and the United Kingdom from 1708 to 1868
- Ayrshire (Parliament of Scotland constituency)

=== United States ===
- Ayrshire, Indiana an unincorporated community in Pike County, Indiana
- Ayrshire, Iowa, a city in Palo Alto County, Iowa

== Facilities and structures ==
- Ayrshire College, Ayrshire, Scotland, UK; a college

== Military ==
- Ayrshire (Earl of Carrick's Own) Yeomanry, of the British Army
- Ayrshire Royal Horse Artillery, a volunteer force supplementing the British Army

== Sports ==
- Ayrshire (horse), a British Thoroughbred racehorse

== Other uses ==
- Ayrshire cattle, a breed of dairy cattle originating from Ayrshire in Scotland

== See also ==
- Central Ayrshire, Ayrshire, Scotland, UK
- East Ayrshire, Ayrshire, Scotland, UK
- North Ayrshire, Ayrshire, Scotland, UK
- South Ayrshire, Ayrshire, Scotland, UK
- Ayr (disambiguation)
- Ayr County (disambiguation)
- Ayr Township (disambiguation)
- Ayre (disambiguation)
- Ayrshire Hospital (disambiguation)
- Shire of Ayr, Queensland, Australia
