= National nature reserve =

Nature reserve deemed to be of national importance

Nature reserves deemed to be of national importance, or controlled by a national-level body may be known as national nature reserves.

== China ==
Zhalong Nature Reserve in Heilongjiang province is designated as a national nature reserve by the Chinese government.

== Czech Republic ==
Soos National Nature Reserve was designated as a nature reserve by the government of the Czech Republic.

== Falkland Islands ==
Beauchêne Island was designated as a national nature reserve by the government of the Falkland Islands in 1964.

== France ==
In France, national nature reserves have been designated since 1976, and are designated by a decree from either a minister or the Conseil d'Etat. As of 2022 there are 168 natural nature reserves in France.

- Néouvielle National Nature Reserve

== Isle of Man ==
As of July 2026 there are two National Nature Reserves on the Isle of Man, both forming part of the Ayres landscape from Jurby eastwards to the Point of Ayre.

== Russia ==
The North-Ossetian National Nature Reserve in the Caucasus Mountains is designated as a national nature reserve by the Russian government.

== United Kingdom ==
In the United Kingdom, "national nature reserves" are those designed by one of the national conservancy bodies, Natural England, Natural Resources Wales, NatureScot, or the Northern Ireland Environment Agency. In total, there are 386 national nature reserves in the UK.
