= Ayr Station Hotel fire =

Structure fire of historical building in Ayr, Scotland

Ayr Station Hotel Fire
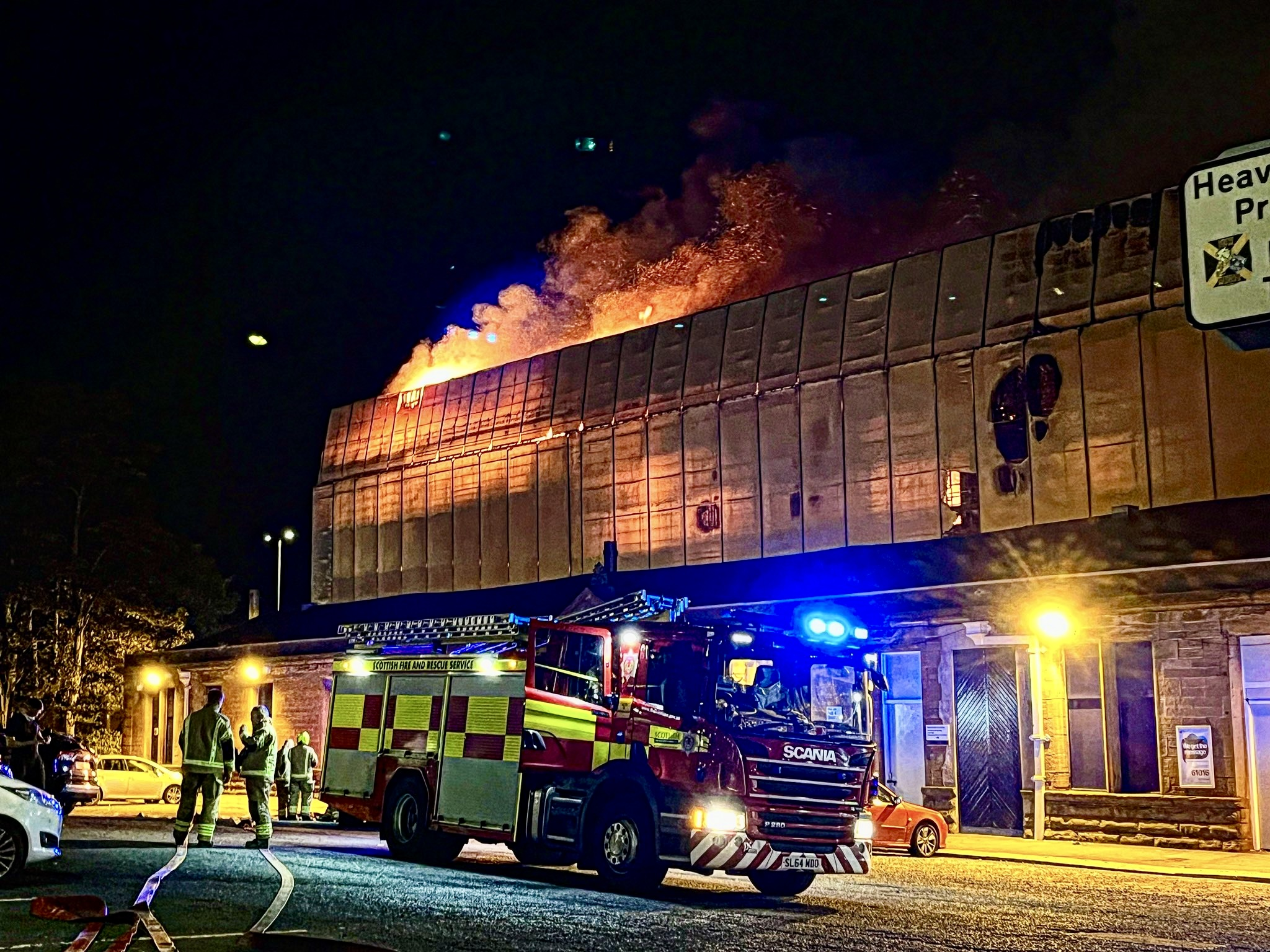
- The building ablaze at late evening, 25 September 2023
- Date: 25–27 September 2023
- Time: 5:37pm (BST)
- Location: Ayr Station Hotel, Burns Statue Square, Ayr, South Ayrshire, Scotland, KA7 3AT; 55.4583°N 4.6258°W
- Type: Fire
- Cause: Deliberate starting of fire to derelict building
- Outcome: Three arrests and charges by Police Scotland; Site transferred to South Ayrshire Council for monitoring and determination of structural integrity Demolition of south wing of a Listed Building, subject to Historic Environment Scotland approval
- Arrests: 3
- Charges: 3

The Ayr Station Hotel fire occurred in Ayr, Scotland on 25 September 2023. The Scottish Fire and Rescue Service were first alerted to a fire at the derelict Ayr Station Hotel building, a Category B Listed Building next to Ayr railway station.

Three arrests were made. A 13-year-old boy and a 17-year-old boy were arrested shortly after the fire, with another 13-year-old boy arrested by Police Scotland on 27 September.

Crews from the Scottish Fire and Rescue Service returned to the scene on 2 October 2023, following reports of a second fire.

== Background ==
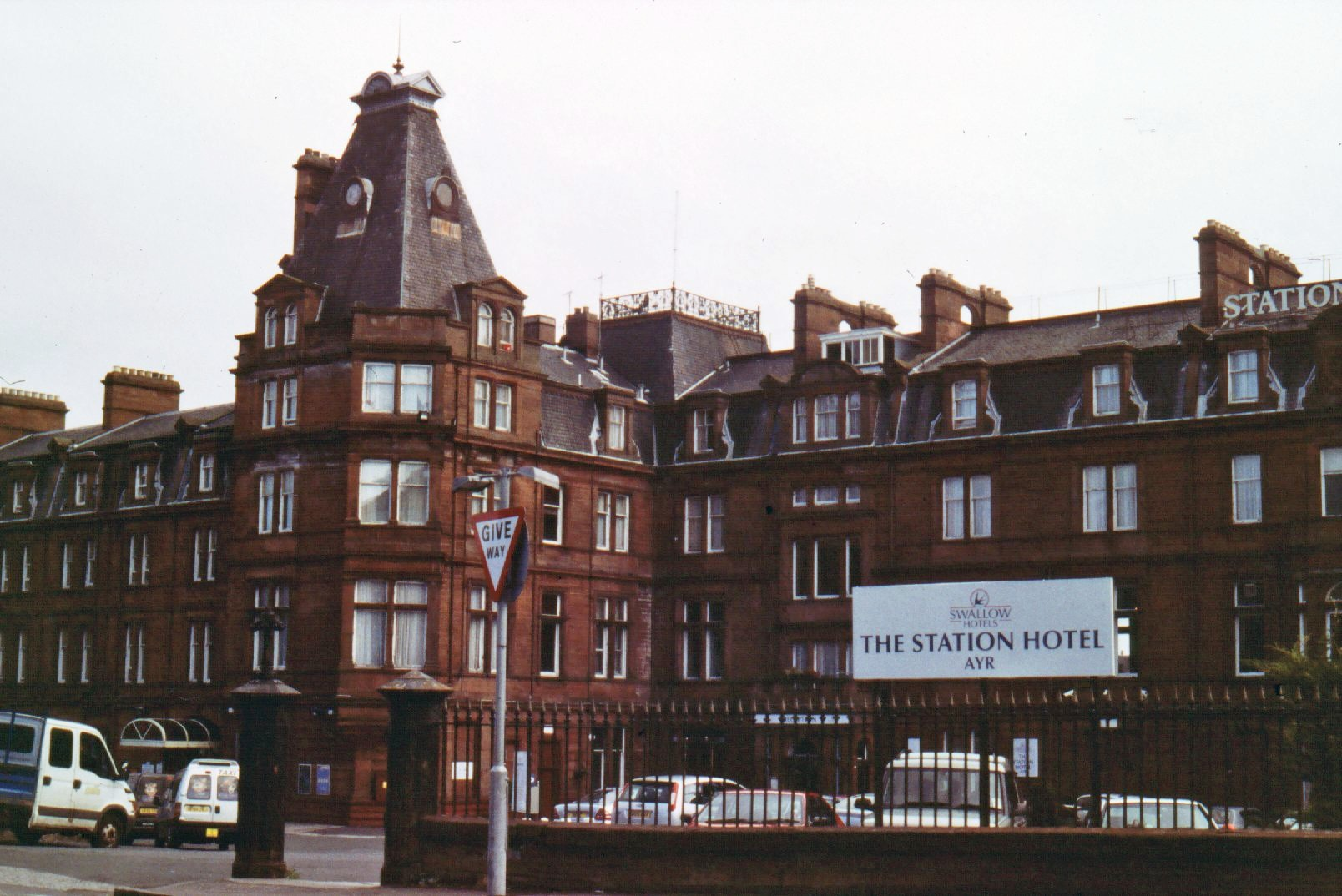
The station hotel building in 2005

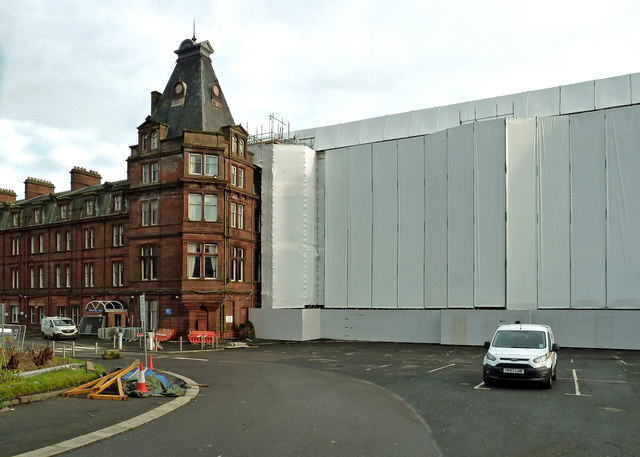
Much of the building had been wrapped in protective sheeting and scaffolding since 2018.

Ayr Station Hotel was designed by Scottish engineer Andrew Galloway and opened in 1885. The hotel had become a symbol of Ayr, and had become best used for wedding receptions and other functions. By 2023, the building was owned by Eng Huat Un, a Malaysian businessman, who bought the hotel in 2010, and by 2013, the hotel had closed permanently due to a period of low use. The closure was initially thought to be for refurbishment purposes, but no Planning or Listed Building Consents were ever received to South Ayrshire Council.

Shortly after closure, members of the public began expressing concern for the building's poor condition, and had advocated for the building to be included on the Buildings at Risk Register for Scotland. The building was formally deemed to be "at risk" and was placed on the register in September 2014.

The building was wrapped in protective scaffolding and measures were taken to encapsulate the building from the public. The measures and erection of protective scaffolding to prevent parts of the building from crumbling and landing in the surrounding area were estimated to be costing taxpayers £52,000 per month.

The building had become a target for break-ins which had heightened concerns about the state of the building, with serious water leaks and parts of the hotel in a perilous condition. A fire occurred at the building in May 2023, with two teenage boys arrested and charged in connection with the fire.

There had been much public debate and speculation regarding the condition of the building, and South Ayrshire Council and the absent owner of the building in Malaysia reaching a stalemate over the future of the building. Months prior to the fire occurring, charity group Save Britain's Heritage were commissioned to carry out a structural assessment on the condition of the building. The report, which was made public on September 14, days prior to the fire, found the building to be "in much better condition than previously thought" and that it was "perfectly practical" to repair the building and bring it back into some form of use.

The report also estimated repair costs to the building standing at £9.2 million, compared to the £6.6 million estimated by South Ayrshire Council for demolishing the southern section of the building which had been proposed. Save Britain's Hertitage who carried out the report and had been campaigning since 2016 to save the building and restore it back into use said it was "devastated" following the fire, and advocated for an "urgent survey" to be carried out to determine the impact the fire had on the structural integrity of the building and whether it could be saved.

== Fire ==
=== 25 September ===
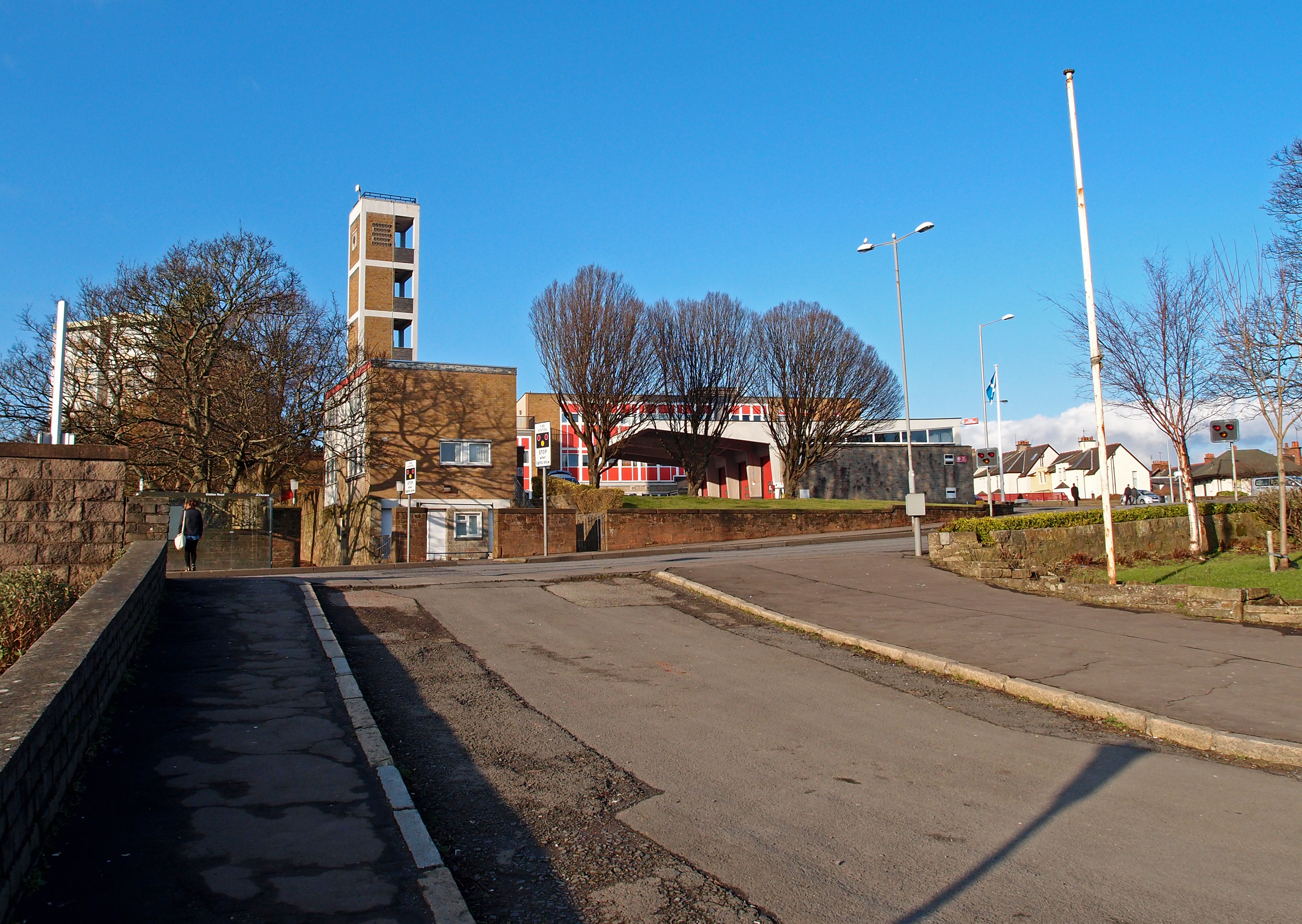
Ayr Fire Station had specialist high rise fire fighting equipment removed one month prior to the fire.

On Monday 25 September 2023, at 5:37pm, the Scottish Fire and Rescue Service received the first report of a fire at the Station Hotel and quickly arrived on scene. Operations control of the Scottish Fire and Rescue Service had mobilised 15 fire fighting appliances at the scene at the height of the fire, and members of the public were advised to keep away from the area as well as keeping all windows and doors closed to prevent smoke from the fire entering homes and public spaces. The local fire department, Ayr Station, were forced to wait for 20 minutes for specialist high rise fire fighting equipment to arrive from Kilmarnock, approximately 14 miles (23 km) away, as, following budget cuts, the high rise equipment was removed from Ayr station one month prior to the fire happening.

The Fire Brigades Union criticised this decision to remove the equipment, with Colin Brown, Scottish Executive Council member of the Fire Brigade Union, saying that the decision was "endangering the lives of firefighters”. Brown added that "the fire at the Station Hotel Ayr is the latest example of the madness of the cuts being imposed on the Scottish Fire and Rescue Service. At a time when fire appliances and high reach vehicles have been withdrawn this huge fire meant that fire appliances were called from across the South and West of Scotland leaving communities behind with little or no cover should another incident have occurred at the same time. Surely, with this incident Siobhian Brown can see that the cuts she is overseeing are endangering the lives of firefighters and the communities they serve.”

Rail operator ScotRail, responsible for Ayr railway station next to the Station Hotel, had cancelled all trains in and out of Ayr railway station due to safety concerns. Replacement buses were commissioned, with trains between Glasgow Central railway station and Ayr having to begin and terminate at Kilwinning railway station as a result of the fire and the impact on railway services.

Local MSP for Ayr, Siobhian Brown, also serves in the Scottish Government as Minister for Victims and Community Safety, and is responsible for overseeing the Scottish Fire and Rescue Service. In an interview with West FM, Brown said that whilst she does not "have a blank cheque", she affirmed that she would be "fighting to ensure the Scottish Fire and Rescue Service is properly funded", following criticism received at the decision to remove specialist high rise equipment from Ayr fire station.

=== 26 September ===
Crews from the Scottish Fire and Rescue Service continued to fight the fire into the early hours of Tuesday morning. By 6:30am on Tuesday morning, the emergency operation had been reduced to three pumps and two high-reach vehicles. Fire crews with an aerial appliance travelled more than 35 miles (56 km) from Castlemilk in Glasgow to assist local firefighters in their response to the continued efforts to extinguish the fire.

Rail services continued to be cancelled on Tuesday, with a number of roads in the area surrounding the building being closed, causing significant disruption and delay in Ayr town centre. Rail operator ScotRail announced that they were not expecting to be able to run services to or from Ayr station for "at least the next few days".

=== 27 September ===
By Wednesday, concerns were growing for the building and fire and rescue operations due to the imminent arrival of Storm Agnes. Fire crews continued to be on site on Wednesday 27 September, three days since the first began, in an attempt to douse the fire. Fire chiefs from the Scottish Fire and Rescue Service confirmed that the building would be under close and careful watch as the storm was expected to hit land, and that they had some initial concerns regarding the structural integrity of the building which had already been a concern prior to the fire occurring. A spokesperson from the Scottish Fire and Rescue Service confirmed that fire crews were "likely to remain on scene throughout today (September 27) and tomorrow (September 28).

On 27 September, Police Scotland confirmed a third suspect, a 13 year old boy, had been arrested in connection with the fire.

=== 2 October ===
Two crews from the Scottish Fire and Rescue Service attended a second reported fire at the Station Hotel building on 2 October 2023. It was quickly confirmed that crews had left the scene, but the fire service confirmed they would send appliances to the building later that evening to "ensure the fire does not return".

== Aftermath ==
On 28 September, emergency response units from both the Scottish Fire and Rescue Service and Police Scotland were preparing to stand down, allowing the site to formally be handed over to South Ayrshire Council. In a statement, South Ayrshire Council said "the site will be handed over to the Council today to allow our Building Standards team to begin to carry out safety works. Fencing will be erected around the site to create a secure compound for the duration of the safety works. It's too early to say how long these works will last for, and we will provide a further update when more information becomes available. 24 hour security will be in place at the site. We anticipate that more roads around the site will be able to re-open from today and we'll issue information about this when we know more."

On September 29, the building and site was handed over to South Ayrshire Council by the emergency services, with the council confirming that the councils building standards team had secured the area. The owner of the Station Hotel, who lives in Malaysia, has not contacted the council, with the council instead attempting to make contact with him.

South Ayrshire Council confirmed that safety works would begin on Monday 4 October.

It was deemed to be unsafe to access the building, therefore, drone footage and high level access platforms were used to undertake structural inspections of the condition of the building. South Ayrshire Council anticipated that the first drone inspection will take place on 29 September.

Following review of drone footage used to gain access to the building, it was confirmed that the building was in an unstable condition and that demolition could occur "within days". Any request for demolition would require to be approved by Historic Environment Scotland due to the buildings listed building status.

=== Reaction ===
The fire led to mixed reactions from locals, many of whom had deemed the building an "eyesore" in the town and that the fire and destruction of the building being "only a matter of time". Many locals said that they would "not be surprised" if the Category B listed building was demolished, with one eyewitness saying "A lot of folk have got great memories, younger days when there were discos and a lot of people had weddings in it. But it's been a bit of an eyesore for quite a few years". Another claimed he was "speechless at the devastation", with another claiming "it was an eyesore but it still feels a bit sad".

=== Demolition ===
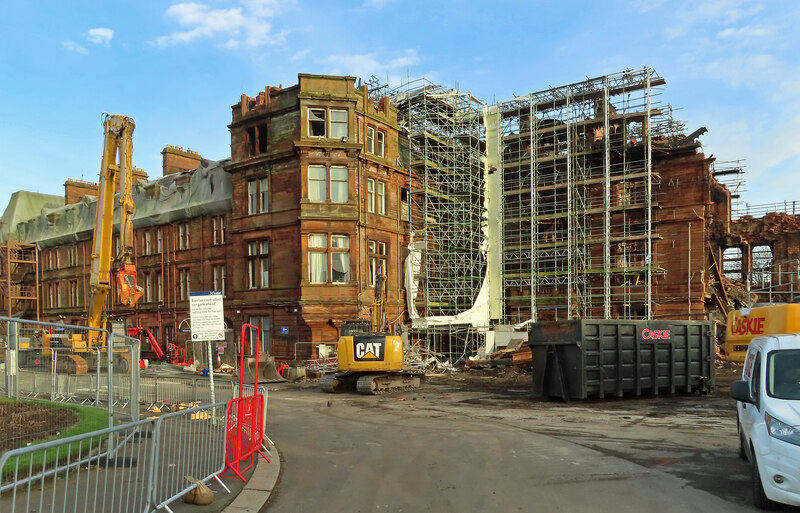
Demolition progress at the Station Hotel, January 2024

By the end of September 2023, South Ayrshire Council had confirmed that whilst the building was still unsafe for entry, drone footage confirmed that the fire had caused "extensive damage" to the structure of the building, with "external walls of the southern section may be at risk of falling". At that time, South Ayrshire Council had not concluded its next steps regarding a full or partial demotion of the building.

In December 2023, demolition work began at the Station Hotel, with contractors beginning work onsite to demolish the gable end wall at the southern section of the hotel. Local reaction to the demolition was mixed, with one local claiming they were "sad to see it go" but claiming that the demolition of the vacant building was "long overdue".

Campaign group, Save Britain's Heritage, said they were "shocked at the level of demolition" of the building. In a statement, a spokesperson for the group said that "we have requested South Ayrshire Council urgently make public all the advice and reports relied on to justify the current level of demolition of Ayr Station Hotel, as well as their plans for the remainder of the south wing, the north wing of the hotel which was largely unaffected by the fire, and the ornate glass and steel station canopy".

In response, South Ayrshire Council defended its demolition decision, stating that "the condition of the southern section is being continually assessed and safety works will continue until the building is no longer a danger to the public or the surrounding infrastructure. Those working on the site are best placed to assess the condition of the building".

By January and February 2024, most of the southern wing of the building had been demolished, leading for calls of "transparency and preservation" of the building and its associated demolition works. In January 2024, Save Britain’s Heritage, the Architectural Heritage Society of Scotland (AHSS), Glasgow Building Preservation Trust, Ayr Station Hotel Community Action Group, Ayr Development Trust, Glasgow City Heritage Trust and Ayrshire Architectural Heritage Trust were signatories of a letter to Chief Executive of South Ayrshire Council, Mike Newall, calling for "the need for South Ayrshire Council to make public their plans for the remaining elements of the hotel". The letter claims that in Scots law, there is an obligation which would make it necessary for the council to consider various and different options in order to "ensure the safety of the listed building before resorting to demolition".

== Suspects ==
Police Scotland arrested two suspects, a 13-year-old boy and a 17-year-old boy in connection with the incident shortly after the fire began. A third suspect, a 13-year-old boy, was arrested and charged in connection with the incident on Wednesday 27 September. Police Scotland stated that each of the three suspects "will be sent to the relevant authorities" and a report made in connection to each arrest.

== See also ==
- Ayr railway station, the railway station that the Station Hotel is part of
