= Castleberg Hospital =

- Airedale NHS Foundation Trust
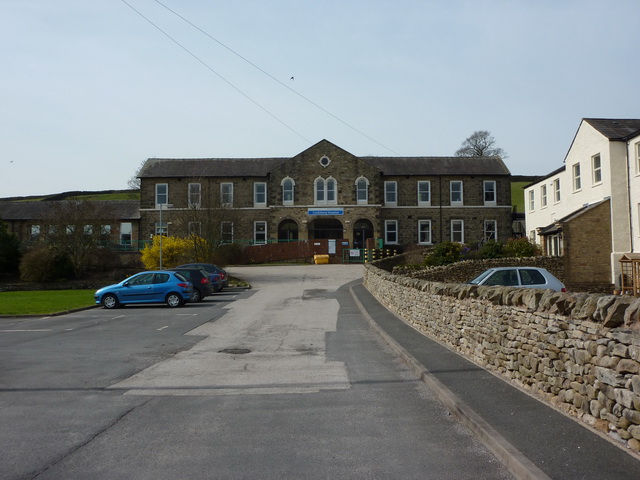
- Castleberg Hospital

- Shown in North Yorkshire

Geography
- Location: Raines Road, Giggleswick, North Yorkshire, England
- Coordinates: 54.0695°N 2.2922°W

Organisation
- Care system: NHS

Services
- Emergency department: No

History
- Founded: 1834

Links
- Lists: Hospitals in England

Castleberg Hospital is a health facility in Raines Road, Giggleswick, North Yorkshire, England. It is managed by Airedale NHS Foundation Trust.

== History ==
The facility had its origins in the Settle Union Workhouse which opened in 1834. A new infirmary was added in 1900. It became the Settle Public Assistance Institution in 1930 and then joined the National Health Service as Castleberg Hospital in 1948. In the early 1950s, it was still offering geriatric and psychiatric care through the provision of 136 beds.

Four new residential care homes were opened in Craven District in anticipation of the closure of the learning disability section of the hospital in 1995.

The hospital continued to serve as a community hospital but closed in April 2017 because of concerns over its power supply, heating and drainage. After significant concerns were raised by the local member of parliament and Government Deputy Chief Whip, Julian Smith, a major refurbishment programme was completed and the hospital re-opened again in September 2019.
