= Ayrshire Hospital =

Ayrshire Hospital may refer to:

- Ayrshire Central Hospital, Irvine, Ayrshire, Scotland, UK
- Ayrshire District Asylum, Ayr, Ayrshire, Scotland, UK
- East Ayrshire Community Hospital, Cumnock, Ayrshire, Scotland, UK

== See also ==
- NHS Ayrshire and Arran, a national health region
- Ayr Hospital (disambiguation)
- Ayrshire (disambiguation)
