= Ayr (constituency) =

There have been several elective constituencies called Ayr:

- Ayr, Carrick and Cumnock (UK Parliament constituency); since 2005
- Ayr (UK Parliament constituency); 1950–2005
- Ayr Burghs (UK Parliament constituency); 1708–1950
- Ayr (Parliament of Scotland constituency); 1567–1708
- Ayr and Renfrew (Commonwealth Parliament constituency); 1654–1669
- Ayr (Scottish Parliament constituency); since 1999

== See also ==
- Ayrshire (constituency)
- Ayr (disambiguation)
