= Ayr Township =

Ayr Township may refer to:

- Ayr Township, Adams County, Nebraska, US
- Ayr Township, Cass County, North Dakota, US
- Ayr Township, Pennsylvania, US
- Township of Ayr, Shire of Burdekin, North Queensland, Queensland, Australia; see Ayr, Queensland

== See also ==
- Ayr (disambiguation), including towns Ayr
- Ayr County (disambiguation)
- Ayrshire (disambiguation), Ayr Shire
