= Ayrshire (constituency) =

There have been several elective constituencies called Ayrshire:

- Ayrshire (Parliament of Scotland constituency); 1605–1707
- Ayrshire (UK Parliament constituency); 1708–1868
- South Ayrshire (UK Parliament constituency); 1868–1983
- North Ayrshire (UK Parliament constituency); 1868–1918
- Bute and Northern Ayrshire (UK Parliament constituency); 1918–1983
- Central Ayrshire (UK Parliament constituency); 1950-1983 and since 2005
- North Ayrshire and Arran (UK Parliament constituency); since 2005

== See also ==
- Ayr (constituency)
- Ayrshire (disambiguation)
