= Willard C. Brinton =

American consulting engineer

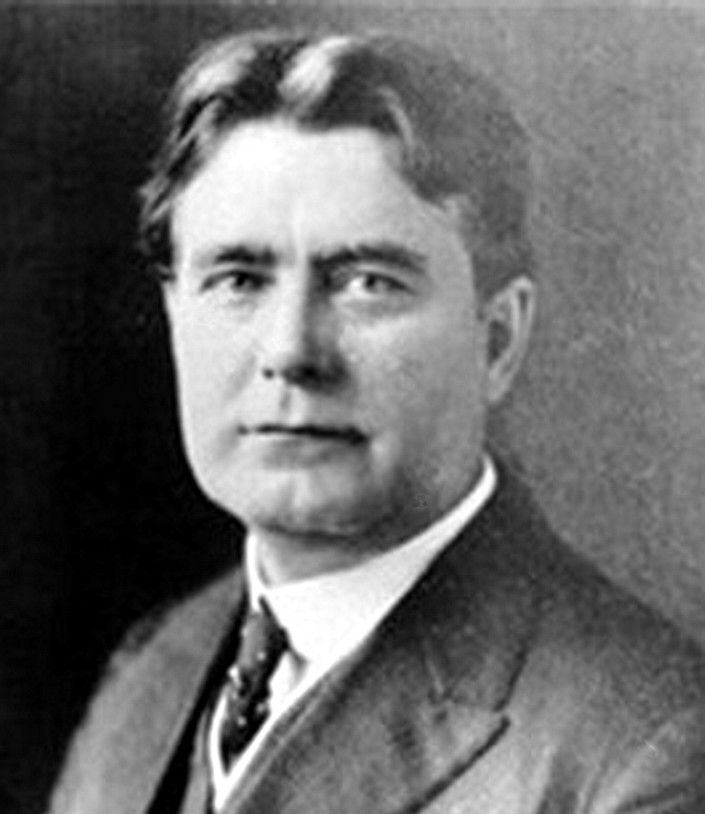
- Born: December 22, 1880; West Chester, Pennsylvania, US
- Died: November 29, 1957 (aged 76)
- Engineering career
- Discipline: information visualisation
- Practice name: Brinton Associates

Willard Cope Brinton (December 22, 1880 – November 29, 1957) was an American consulting engineer, president of Brinton Associates, and information visualisation pioneer, particularly known for publication of the 1914 textbook on graphic methods, entitled Graphic methods for presenting facts.

== Biography ==
Brinton was born in West Chester, Pennsylvania, to Samuel Lewis and Elizabeth (Smith) Brinton. He received his BS in Mechanical engineering from Harvard University in 1907.

Brinton started his career as mechanical engineer working for various companies, and travelled through the United States, and to Europe, Japan and China. Back in New York he started his own consulting company. One of his notable works in the early 1920s was the proposal to initiate a bi-state New York harbor agency, which resulted in the creation of the Port of New York Authority. Brinton also designed production-control equipment for which he received several patents, and wrote two textbooks on graphic methods.

Brinton had become associate member of the ASME in 1907 and full member in 1912. In 1914 he became chairman of a new committee to develop standards for graphic presentation. He was director of the American Statistical Association in 1917 under the presidency of Allyn Abbott Young, and was elected as a Fellow of the American Statistical Association in 1922. He was president of the Harvard Engineering Society in 1932, and member of the Newcomen Society of the United States.

== Work ==
=== Graphic methods for presenting facts, 1914 ===
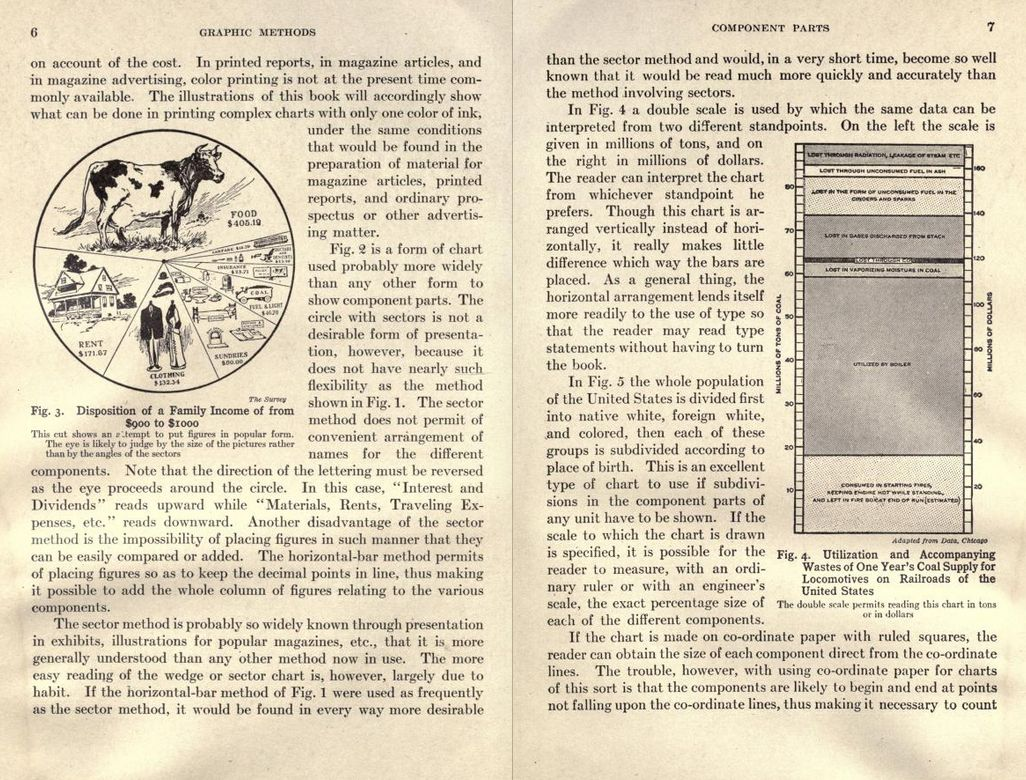
Graphic methods for presenting facts, 1914, p. 6-7.

In the Preface of "Graphic methods for presenting facts," (1914) Brinton explained the intention of his work:

In the preparation of this book there has been a constant effort to present the subject to suit the point of view of the business man, the social worker, and the legislator. Mathematics have been entirely eliminated. Technical terms are used practically not at all. Since the readers whom it is most desired to reach are those who have never had any statistical training, consistent effort has been made to keep the whole book on such a plane that it may be found readable and useful by anyone dealing with the complex facts of business or government. Though written primarily for the non-technical man, it is hoped that this book may, nevertheless, prove convenient to the engineer, the biologist, and the statistician.

More in detail Brinton continued:

A definite effort has been made to produce a work which can serve as a hand book for anyone who may have occasional charts to prepare for reports, for magazine illustration, or for advertising. Unfortunately, there are extremely few draftsmen who know how to plot a curve or prepare any kind of a chart from data presented to them in the form of tabulated figures. Most draftsmen can plot a curve if they are given the data and an example showing the general type of chart desired. The executive who desires a chart is usually too busy to stand by a draftsman and explain in detail just how the chart should be prepared as concerns those all important details of proportion, scale, width of line, etc. It is believed that the owner of this book will find it feasible to run through the various chapters and pages until he finds a chart most nearly like that which he desires to have made from his own data. A sample chart placed before any draftsman of average ability should give the draftsman practically all the instruction needed for the preparation of a similar chart from other data.

In a 2012 blog G.K. VanPatter commented, that "Graphic Methods for Presenting Facts is an impressive, early survey of what would today be considered to be bare-bones statistical diagrams and graphic techniques that existed at that moment. Now scarce in original form, this early volume is recognized as the first American book focused on graphic techniques geared for a general audience." In 1921 William Crosby Marshall published a comparable work, and in 1923 Karl G. Karsten followed. About 16 years later in 1939 Brinton published a second renewed edition of his work.

=== Knowledge representation ===
In Graphic methods for presenting facts (1914) explained about the need for knowledge representation:

After a person has collected data and studied a proposition with great care so that his own mind is made up as to the best solution for the problem, he is apt to feel that his work is about completed. Usually, however, when his own mind is made up, his task is only half done.

According to Brinton ineffective presentation can lead to fallacious conclusions:

It is often with impotent exasperation that a person having the knowledge sees some fallacious conclusion accepted, or some wrong policy adopted, just because known facts cannot be marshalled and presented in such manner as to be effective.

And furthermore:

Ordinarily, facts do not speak for themselves. When they do speak for themselves, the wrong conclusions are often drawn from them. Unless the facts are presented in a clear and interesting manner, they are about as effective as a phonograph record with the phonograph missing.

=== Joint Committee on Standards for Graphic Presentation ===
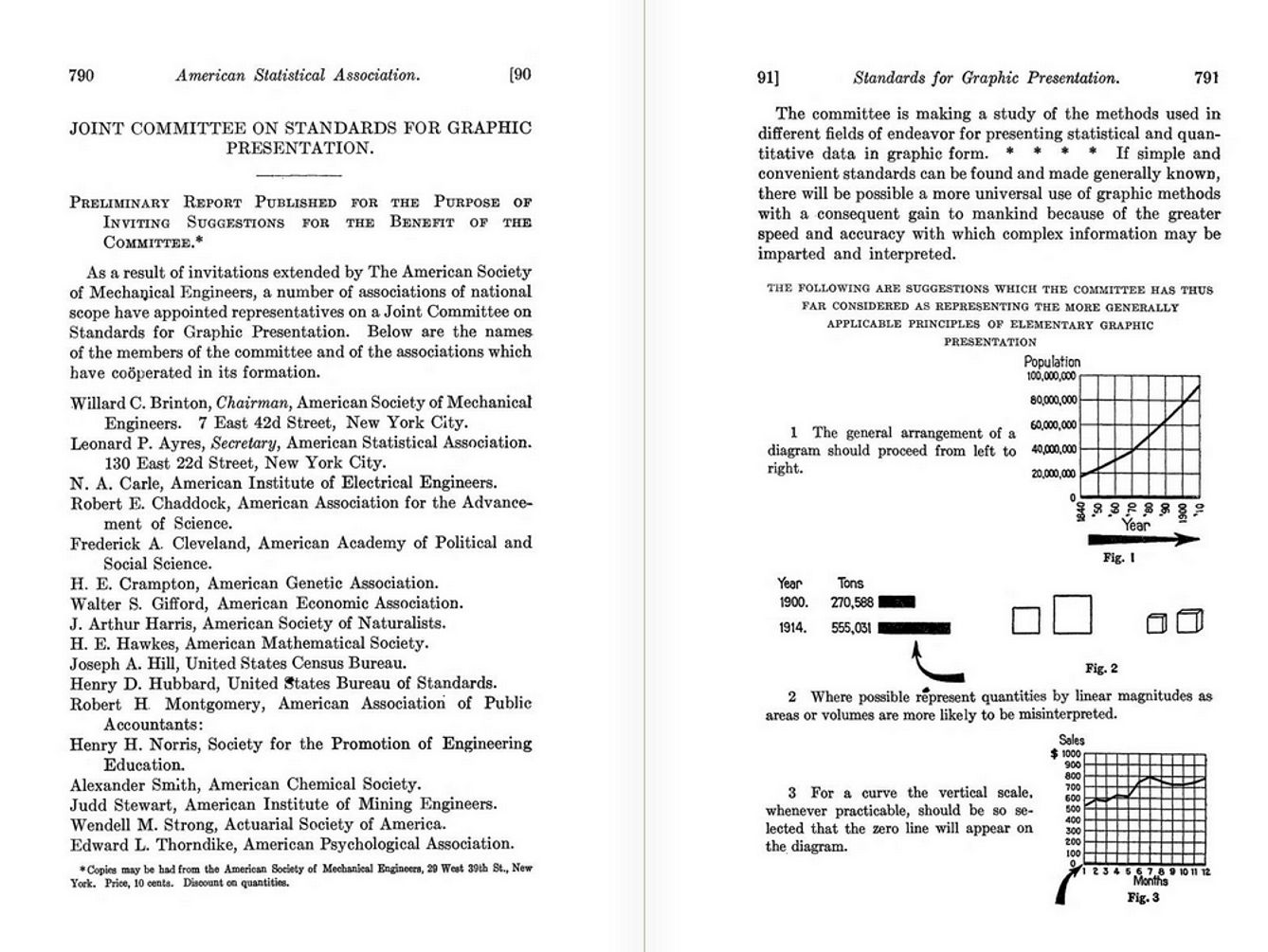
First article of the Joint Committee on Standards for Graphic Presentation, 1915

On the initiative of Willard C. Brinton and the American Society of Mechanical Engineers in 1913 a Joint Committee on Standards for Graphic Presentation was initiated. In this commission participated 15 scientific societies with a national scope, and 2 bureaus of the US federal government. The commission was chaired by Willard C. Brinton, and Leonard Porter Ayres of the American Statistical Association was its secretary. The initial meeting of the committee was held in December 1914.

The committee made a study of the methods used in different fields of endeavor for presenting statistical and quantitative data in graphic form. Its intention in 1915 was described as:

If simple and convenient standards can be found and made generally known, there will be possible a more universal use of graphic methods with a consequent gain to mankind because of the greater speed and accuracy with which complex information may be imparted and interpreted.

In 1915 the committee published their first report, described as preliminary. It consisted of a first set of suggestions, which the committee had thus far considered as representing the more generally applicable principles of elementary graphic presentation in several magazines of the participating scientific societies.

Calvin F. Schmid (1978) summarized: "The report was relatively brief, consisting of 17 simply stated basic rules, each illustrated with one to three diagrams. Fourteen of the rules, including the accompanying diagrams, were devoted exclusively to the portrayal of time series in the form of arithmetic line charts. Of the three remaining rules, one emphasized the preference of linear magnitudes over areas or volumes, another represented a simple procedure pertaining to semi-logarithmetic charts, and the last, the desirability of emphasizing the 100 percent or other base line in the delineation of an arithmetic grid."

Since this first publication of standards in graphic presentation other committees in the US published revised and extended standards of graphic presentation, according to Schmid (1978), in 1936, 1938, and 1960.

== Selected publications ==
Brinton authored two books on graphic presentation methods, and numerous magazine articles. Books:

- Brinton, Willard Cope. Graphic methods for presenting facts. The Engineering magazine company, 1914.
- Brinton, Willard Cope. Graphic presentation. New York city, Brinton associates, 1939.

Articles, a selection:

- American Statistical Association. "Joint committee on standards for graphic presentation." Publications of ASA 14 (1916): 790-797.

== Patents ==
- Patent US1496366 - Siphon
- Patent US1524473 - Freight-handling apparatus
- Patent US1566521 - Freight shed
- Patent US1720204 - Object-holding rig for trucks
- Patent US1725750 - Guards and curtain closure
