= Ayr Hospital =

Ayr Hospital may refer to:

- University Hospital Ayr, Ayr, Ayrshire, Scotland, UK
- Ayr County Hospital, South Ayrshire, Ayrshire, Scotland, UK
- Ayrshire District Asylum, Ayr, Ayrshire, Scotland UK

== See also ==
- Ayr (disambiguation)
- Ayrshire Hospital (disambiguation)
