= Mount Ayr =

Mount Ayr, Ayrmont, Ayr Mountains, or variation, may refer to:

== Places ==
- Aïr Mountains, Niger; a triangular massif bordering the Sahara desert
- Ayr Mountains, Kazakhstan

USA

Mount Ayr is the name of several places in the United States:

- Mount Ayr, Indiana; a town
- Mount Ayr, Iowa; a city
- Mount Ayr Township, Kansas

== Other uses ==
- Ayr Mount, Hillsborough, Orange County, North Carolina, USA; a heritage building plantation house

== See also ==
- Ayr Hill, Virginia, USA
- Ayr (disambiguation)
