= Skipton General Hospital =

Hospital in North Yorkshire, England

- Airedale NHS Foundation Trust
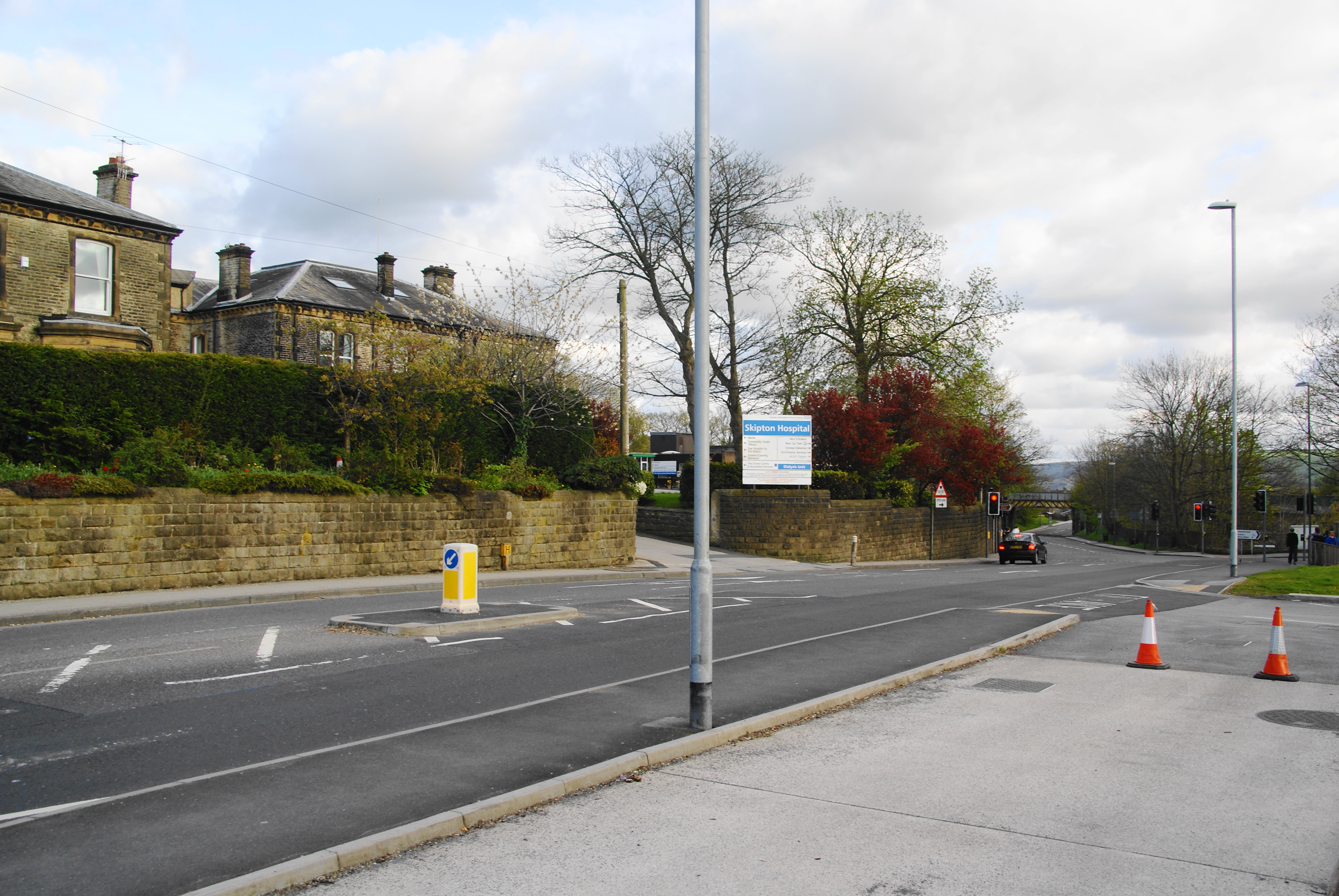
- Skipton General Hospital

- Shown in North Yorkshire

Geography
- Location: Keighley Road, Skipton, North Yorkshire, England
- Coordinates: 53.9554°N 2.0192°W

Organisation
- Care system: NHS

Services
- Emergency department: No

History
- Founded: 1899

Links
- Lists: Hospitals in England

Skipton General Hospital is a health facility in Keighley Road, Skipton, North Yorkshire, England. It is managed by Airedale NHS Foundation Trust.

== History ==
The facility has its origins in the Skipton Cottage Hospital in Granville Street which was built to commemorate the Golden Jubilee of Queen Victoria and which opened by the pioneer of women's education, Lucy Cavendish, in 1899. An annual gala was subsequently held to raise funds for equipment for the hospital.

After the cottage hospital became too small for local healthcare demands, it was decided to acquire Whinfield House, the former home of Thomas Dewhurst, a mill owner. The building was converted for hospital use and officially opened as the Whinfield Hospital by the Princess Royal in 1932. After the hospital joined the National Health Service in 1948, Princess Mary returned to open a new outpatients department in 1961. After Raikeswood Hospital closed in 1991, Skipton Hospital became the main hospital for the district. Blood testing returned to Skipton General Hospital in July 2021 after being relocated to alternative premises some 9 months previously during the COVID-19 crisis.

The Craven Centre, located at the hospital, provides services for adults with learning disabilities.
