= Prestwick Town railway station =

Railway station in South Ayrshire, Scotland

Prestwick Town Scottish Gaelic: Baile Phreastabhaig
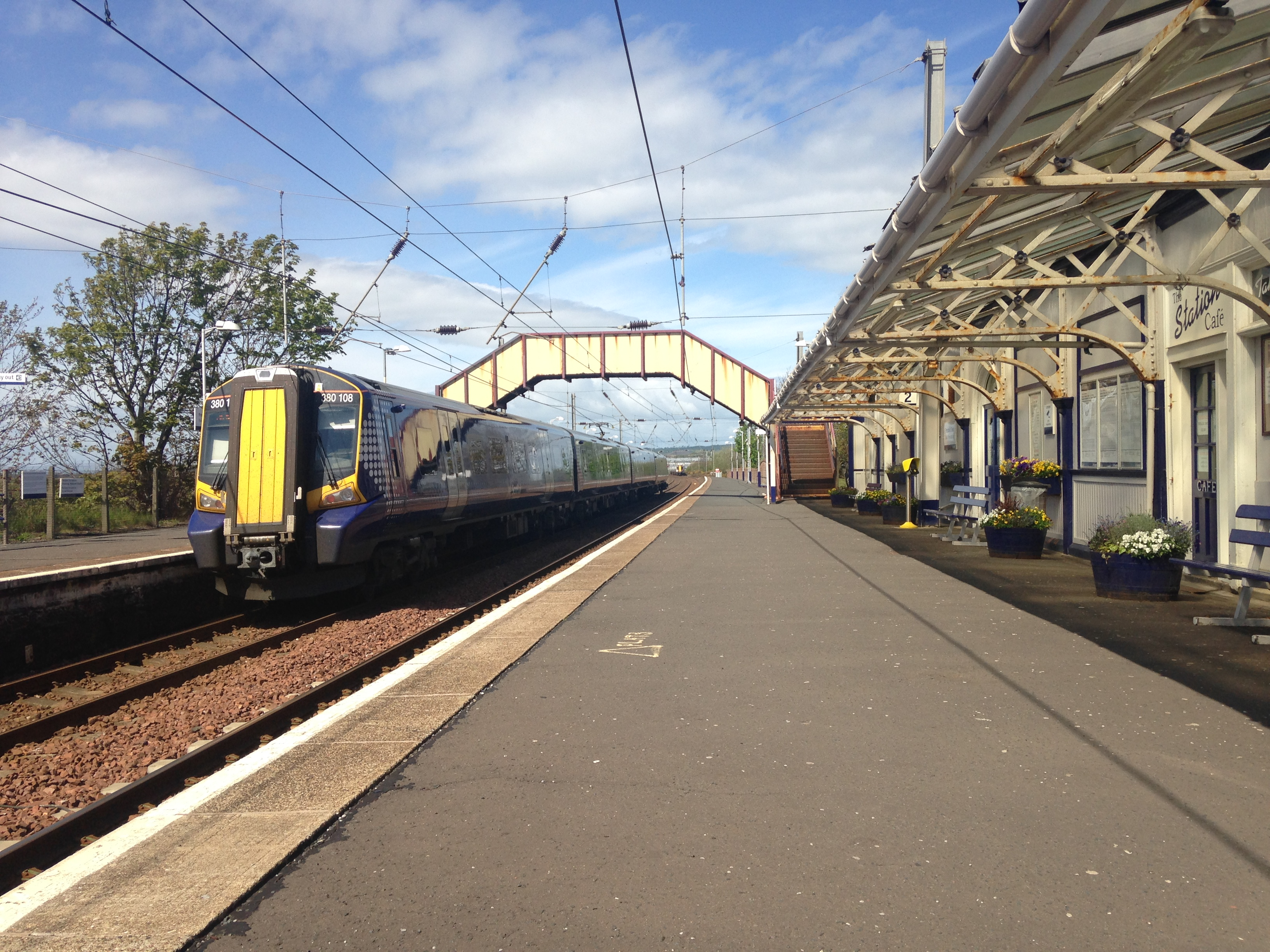

General information
- Location: Prestwick, South Ayrshire; Scotland
- Coordinates: 55.5020°N 4.6143°W
- Grid reference: NS349262
- Manager: ScotRail
- Platforms: 2

Other information
- Station code: PTW

Key dates
- 5 August 1839: Opened as Prestwick
- September 1994: Renamed Prestwick Town

Passengers
- 2021/22: ▲0.186 million
- 2022/23: ▲0.212 million
- 2023/24: ▲0.373 million
- 2024/25: ▼0.341 million
- 2025/26: ▼0.324 million
Location
Notes
- Passenger statistics from the Office of Rail and Road

Prestwick Town railway station is a railway station serving the town of Prestwick, South Ayrshire, Scotland. The station is managed by ScotRail and is on the Ayrshire Coast Line.

== History ==
Originally known only as Prestwick, it was one of the original stations on the Ayr to Irvine portion of the Glasgow, Paisley, Kilmarnock and Ayr Railway opened in August 1839.

== Facilities ==
The ticket office at Prestwick Town has recently been refurbished, and now includes a height-adjustable ticket desk and automatic doors. Smartcard validators have been installed at the entrances to both platforms. Step-free access is only available on platform 2, as the opposite platform is only reachable via a stepped footbridge or steep ramp from the nearby road. Prestwick Town is one of the few stations on the Ayrshire Coast Line that remains staffed (the ticket office being staffed part-time, seven days per week). Facilities include a medium-sized car park and a café is present in the station building itself.

== Services ==
On weekdays and Saturdays, there is a half-hourly service northbound to Glasgow Central and southbound to Ayr. On the Glasgow South Western Line, there are also six trains per day northbound to Kilmarnock, one of which continues to Glasgow Central. Southbound, there are five trains per day to Girvan, one of which continues to Stranraer. Passengers need to change trains at Ayr for other southbound services beyond Ayr station. On Sundays, there is a half-hourly service northbound to Glasgow Central and southbound to Ayr.

Preceding station	National Rail	Following station
Newton-on-Ayr	ScotRail; Ayrshire Coast Line	Prestwick International Airport
Ayr	ScotRail; Glasgow South Western Line	Prestwick International Airport
	Historical railways	
Ayr; Line and station closed	Glasgow and South Western Railway; Glasgow, Paisley, Kilmarnock and Ayr Railway	Monkton; Line open; station closed
Newton-on-Ayr; Line and station open	Glasgow and South Western Railway; Ayr and Dalmellington Railway	Connection with GPK&AR at Falkland Junction
