= Ayr County =

Ayr County may refer to:

- Ayrshire, a historic county in Scotland
  - Ayr County Hospital, Ayrshire, Scotland, closed 1991
- Shire of Ayr, now Shire of Burdekin, a county-level division in Queensland, Australia

== See also ==
- Ayr Township (disambiguation)
- Ayrshire (disambiguation)
- Ayr (disambiguation)
