= Ayre (disambiguation) =

Ayre is one of the six sheadings (governmental subdivisions) in the Isle of Man.

Ayre may also refer to:

== People ==
- Ayre (surname)

== Geography ==
- Ayre (landform), a shingle beach, particularly in Orkney and Shetland
- Point of Ayre, northernmost point of the Isle of Man
- Point of Ayre, Orkney

== Other uses ==
- Ayre or Air (music), a variant of the musical song form
- Ayre and Sons, defunct department store chain founded by Charles Ayre
- Ayre Acoustics, an audio equipment manufacturer

== See also ==
- Aire (disambiguation)
- Ayer (disambiguation)
- Ayr (disambiguation)
- Ayres (disambiguation)
- Eyre (disambiguation)
