= Airedale NHS Foundation Trust =

Public healthcare provider in England

- Type: NHS foundation trust
- Established: 1 June 2010
- Headquarters: Skipton Road, Steeton, Keighley, BD20 6TD
- Hospitals: Airedale General Hospital; Castleberg Hospital; Skipton General Hospital
- Chair: Sarah Jones
- Chief executive: Foluke Ajayi
- Website: www.airedale-trust.nhs.uk

Airedale NHS Foundation Trust is an NHS foundation trust based in West and North Yorkshire, England; it also serves part of East Lancashire.

== About ==
The trust employs 2,900 people and has 400 volunteers. Each year the trust treats 25,000 inpatients, 26,000 non-elective patients and 150,000 outpatients. The emergency department treats over 51,000 each year. An average 2,600 babies are born each year at the Airedale General Hospital. The trust achieved NHS foundation trust status on 1 June 2010.

The trust broke from the national pay agreement in August 2015 by giving a 1% pay rise to its senior non-clinical staff - those earning above £57,069 - in line with the award for the rest of the staff.

In 2017 the trust established a subsidiary company, AGH Solutions Ltd, to which 325 estates and facilities staff were transferred. The intention was to achieve VAT benefits, as well as pay bill savings, by recruiting new staff on less expensive non-NHS contracts. VAT benefits arise because NHS trusts can only claim VAT back on a small subset of goods and services they buy. The Value Added Tax Act 1994 provides a mechanism through which NHS trusts can qualify for refunds on contracted out services.

In 2022 the outstanding maintenance bill was £414 million, the third largest in the English NHS.

== Hospitals ==
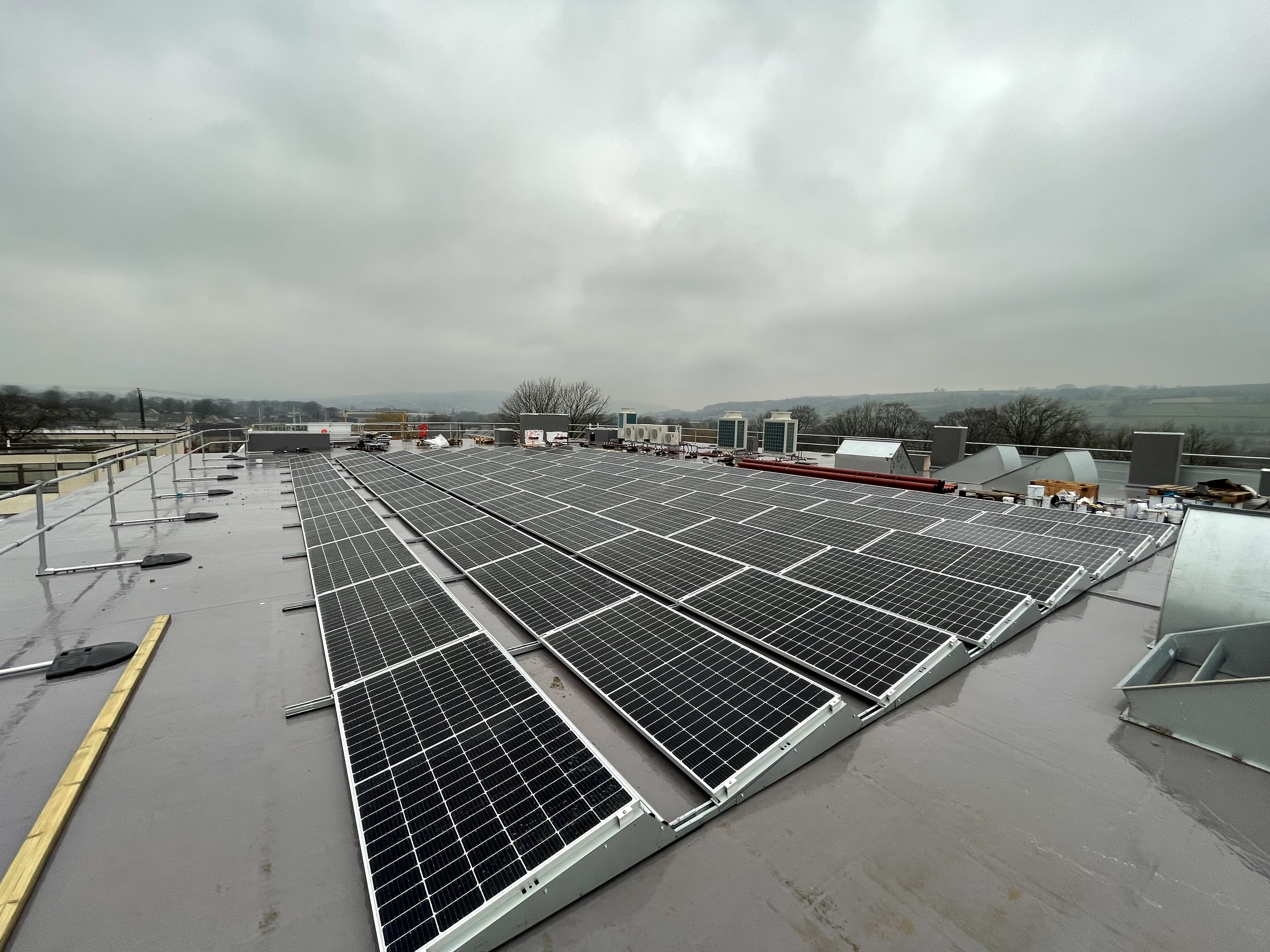
Solar array on Airedale General Hospital in Keighley, England

The trust currently operates the following hospitals:

- Airedale General Hospital, the trust's main hospital in Steeton near Keighley, Airedale.
- Castleberg Hospital, a small community hospital in between Settle and Giggleswick in Craven, founded 1834
- Skipton General Hospital, a small community hospital in central Skipton, Craven, founded 1899

Additionally the trust provides some services at Coronation Hospital in Ilkley in Wharfedale. The trust used to formerly own Coronation Hospital; recent talks have led to the possibility to Coronation Hospital returning to the trust, however there have also been talks for the trust to build a new £3.3m community hospital to serve the Ilkley area.

The trust is viewed as a pioneer in telemedicine in the UK and has used the technology to support very vulnerable patients, particularly those with dementia and in nursing homes. Plans were announced in November 2013 to roll the service out to 50 more nursing and residential homes working with Bradford Teaching Hospitals NHS Foundation Trust.

In 2024, Airedale General Hospital added solar panels to their new multi-storey car park design plans as part of their Securing the Future initiative.

== Performance ==
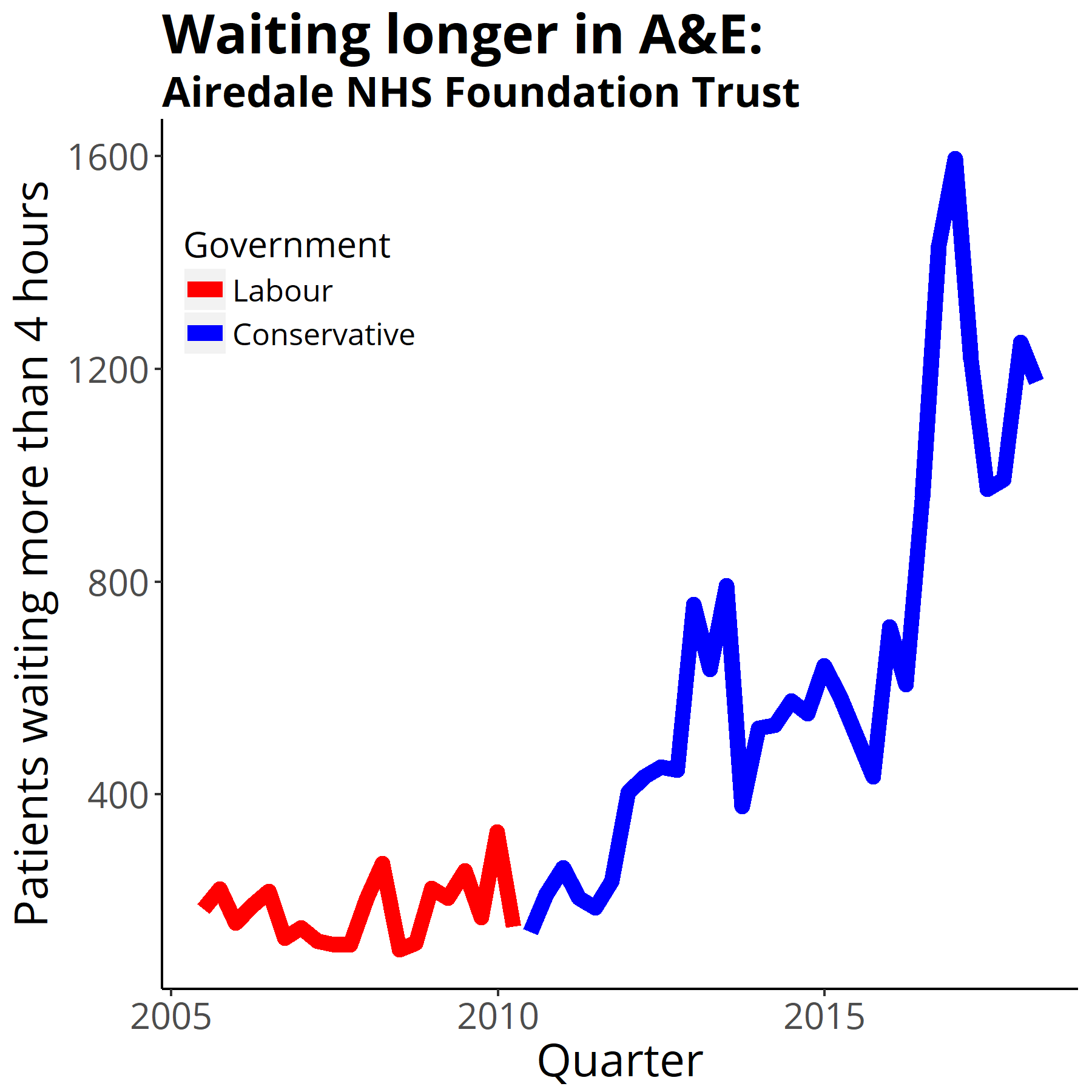
Four-hour target in the emergency department quarterly figures from NHS England Data from https://www.england.nhs.uk/statistics/statistical-work-areas/ae-waiting-times-and-activity/

It was awarded Disability Confident Employer status in 2022.

== See also ==
- List of NHS trusts
