= Ayres =

Ayres may refer to:

== People ==
- Ayres (surname)

== Companies ==
- Ayres (sports company), a British sports equipment manufacturer
- L. S. Ayres, an Indiana department store founded in 1872
- Ayres Corp., a former US aircraft manufacturer
- Ayre and Sons, a department store chain in Newfoundland, Canada

== Other uses ==
- "Ayres Rock" frequent mis-spelling of "Ayers Rock" in South Australia, since renamed Uluru
- Point of Ayre and the Ayres National Nature Reserve in the Isle of Man
- Ayres, former name of Zama, Mississippi
- Ayres Natural Bridge Park, a formation along the Oregon Trail in the State of Wyoming
- Ayres (music)
- Ayres (album)

== See also ==
- Ayre (disambiguation)
- Eyre (disambiguation)
