= Ed Ayres =

Ed Ayres may refer to:

- Ed Ayres (environmentalist) (born 1941), American environmentalist, writer and marathon runner
- Ed Le Brocq (previously Ed Ayres), Australian musician, radio presenter and writer

== See also ==
- Edward L. Ayers (born 1942), American historian
