= Airedale General Hospital =

Hospital in West Yorkshire, England

- Airedale NHS Foundation Trust
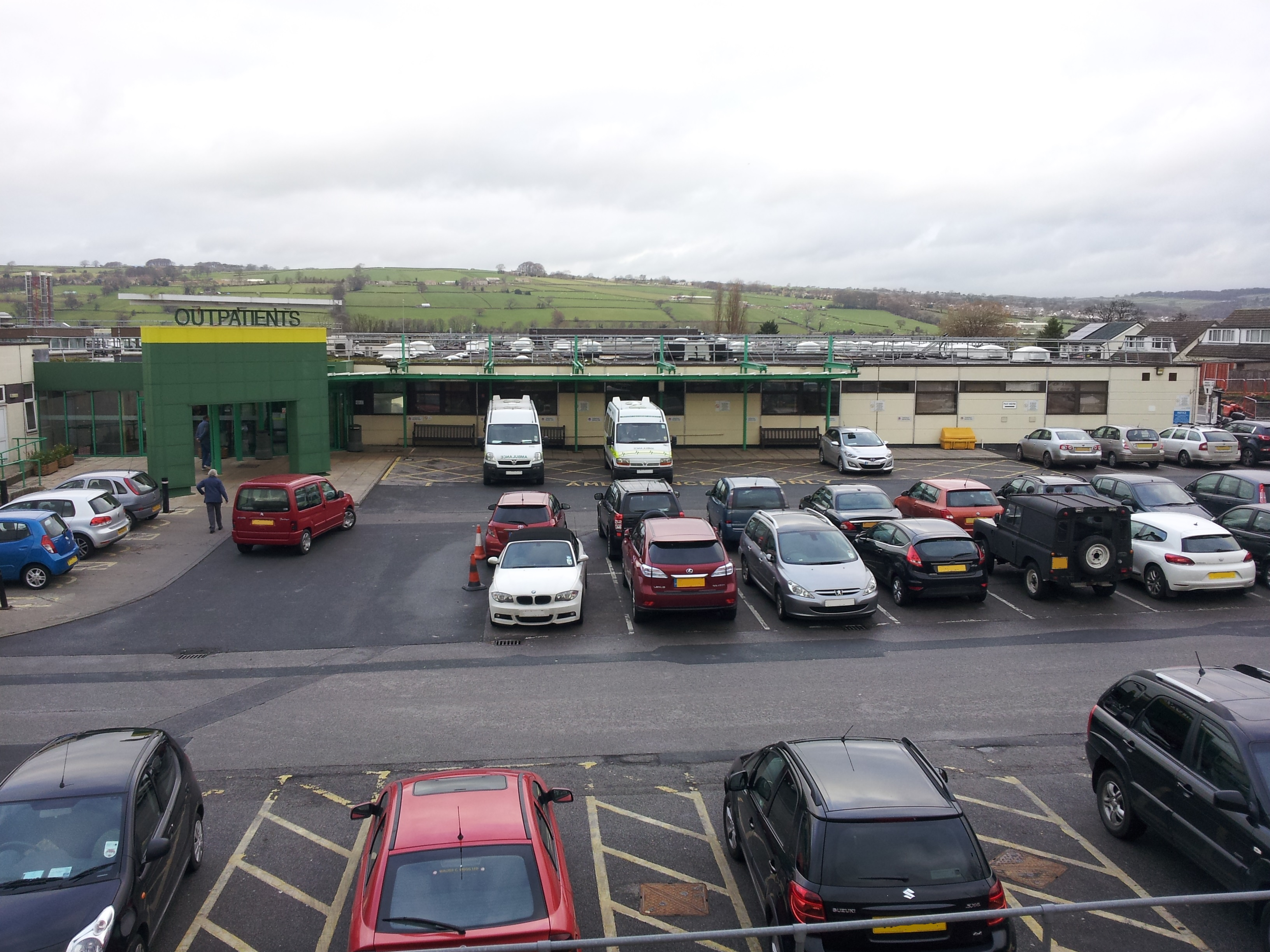
- Outpatients Department Entrance to Airedale General Hospital, December 2013

- Location in West Yorkshire

Geography
- Location: Steeton with Eastburn, West Yorkshire, England
- Coordinates: 53.898000°N 1.962700°W

Organisation
- Care system: NHS
- Type: District General
- Affiliated university: Leeds University School of Medicine

Services
- Emergency department: Yes - Trauma Unit
- Beds: 549 (486 overnight, 63 day)

History
- Founded: 1970

Links
- Lists: Hospitals in England

Airedale General Hospital is an NHS district general hospital based in Steeton with Eastburn, West Yorkshire, England and is operated by the Airedale NHS Foundation Trust. Airedale was opened for patients in July 1970 and officially opened by the Prince of Wales on 11 December of the same year. The hospital covers a wide area including Keighley, Skipton and parts of the Yorkshire Dales and eastern Lancashire. As of 2021, the hospital had links for neurosurgical emergencies with Leeds General Infirmary. The hospital provides 549 beds.

== History ==
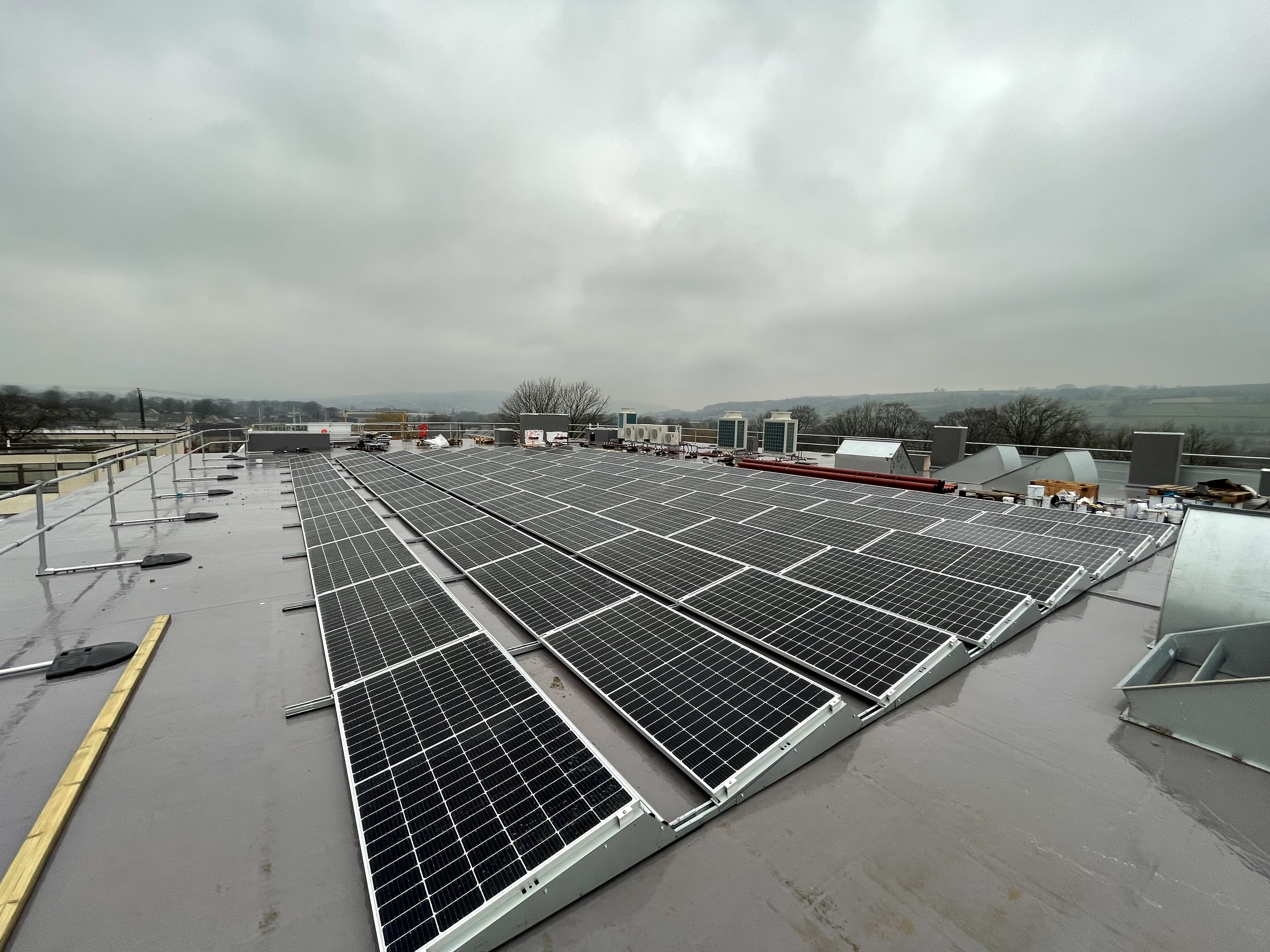
Solar array on Airedale General Hospital in Keighley, England

The hospital was planned as far back as 1963 with many sites being optioned including Silsden and also a site nearer to Skipton. Building work was initiated in 1966 to a plan by then-renowned, later disgraced architect John Garlick Llewellyn Poulson. His later trial had nothing to do with his designs for Airedale Hospital.

The original estimate for the construction of the 32-acre site was £4.5 million including equipment. In 1967, this was revised to £5 million. The hospital, with an initial designation of 650 beds, was due to open in 1969, but was eventually opened in stages starting in July 1970, and was officially opened by the Prince of Wales on 11 December of that year.

Upon opening in July 1970, it was revealed that it would actually house 643 beds and have an eventual cost of £5.4 million. The maternity ward opened on 6 July 1970, after the main sections of the hospital, with the first birth being on 7 July 1970. The opening of Airedale spelt the end for some of the older hospitals in the area, namely Keighley Victoria, St Johns and Morton Bank. These all closed in 1970 on transfer of patients to the new facility. For the first few years of the hospital being open, it had an average employment rota of 1,400 people, making it the largest service employer in the area.

In 1989, Airedale was the hospital that Tony Bland, the 96th Hillsborough disaster victim, was transferred to. Mr Bland was in a persistent vegetative state (PVS) after being crushed at Hillsborough. His parents successfully applied to the High Court to cease his feeding and allow him to die, which he did on 3 March 1993. The hospital was the scene of demonstrations by pro-life campaigners during this time.

In September 2021, the hospital acquired a British Rail Class 144 "Pacer" train carriage after Airedale Hospital and Community Charity, the official charity for Airedale NHS Foundation Trust, won a competition by the Department for Transport. It plans to use the vehicle as a non-clinical communal space.

As of April 2022, the hospital was said to have "the largest single flat roof" of any English hospital – around 320,000 square feet (30,000 m^{2}) – which reportedly resulted in the "most roof leaks in the country". It is also believed to be the oldest reinforced autoclaved aerated concrete (RAAC) hospital in the UK, which poses a dangerous risk to its overall infrastructure. On 25 May 2023 it was announced that the hospital would be rebuilt as it contains significant amounts of RAAC. The Guardian newspaper noted that a 2020 proposal to rebuild Airedale Hospital was not funded by HM Treasury during Rishi Sunak's term as Chancellor of the Exchequer, despite a "catastrophic" grade of risk and a warning that an incident was "likely".

The proposal for a new hospital would see the number of beds increased from 549 (486 overnight, 63 day beds) to 581 beds (508 overnight, 73 day).

== See also ==
- List of hospitals in England
