= Robert Ayres =

Robert Ayres may refer to:

- Robert M. Ayres (1898–1977), American architect
- Robert Ayres (actor) (1914–1968), American actor
- Robert Ayres (scientist) (1932–2023), American-born scientist
- Bob Ayres (rugby league) (1914–1993), British rugby league player
- Bob Ayres (born 1953), American businessman

== See also ==
- Robert Ayers (born 1985), American football player
