= Newton-on-Ayr railway station =

Railway station in Ayr, Scotland

Newton-on-Ayr Scottish Gaelic: Baile Ùr na h-Aibhne
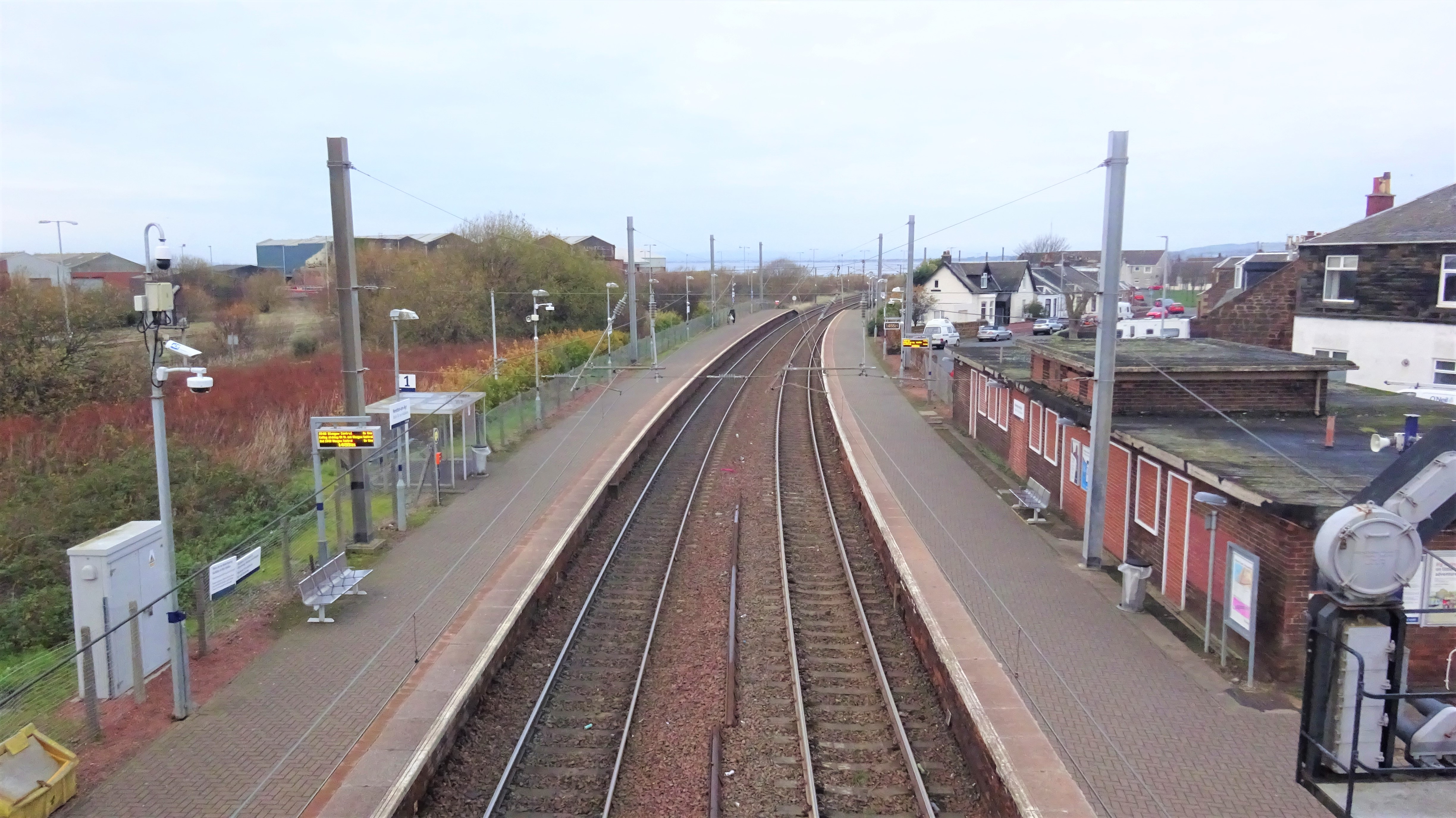
- View north towards Prestwick Town

General information
- Location: Ayr, South Ayrshire; Scotland
- Coordinates: 55.4743°N 4.6262°W
- Grid reference: NS341232
- Manager: ScotRail
- Platforms: 2

Other information
- Station code: NOA

Passengers
- 2021/22: ▲57,026
- 2022/23: ▲68,036
- 2023/24: ▼57,950
- 2024/25: ▲80,008
- 2025/26: ▲0.109 million
Location
Notes
- Passenger statistics from the Office of Rail and Road

Newton-on-Ayr railway station is a railway station serving the Newton on Ayr neighbourhood in the town of Ayr, South Ayrshire, Scotland. The station is managed by ScotRail and is on the Ayrshire Coast Line.

== Facilities ==
Station buildings still exist on the southbound platform, but they have been closed to passengers for many years. A footbridge is present here and a small shelter is present on the northbound platform.

== Services ==
On weekdays and Saturdays, there is a half-hourly service northbound to Glasgow Central and southbound to Ayr. On Sundays, there is an hourly service northbound to Glasgow Central and southbound to Ayr.

| Preceding station | National Rail | Following station |
|---|---|---|
| Ayr | ScotRail; Ayrshire Coast Line | Prestwick Town |
