= Mount Aire =

Mountain in Salt Lake County, Utah, United States

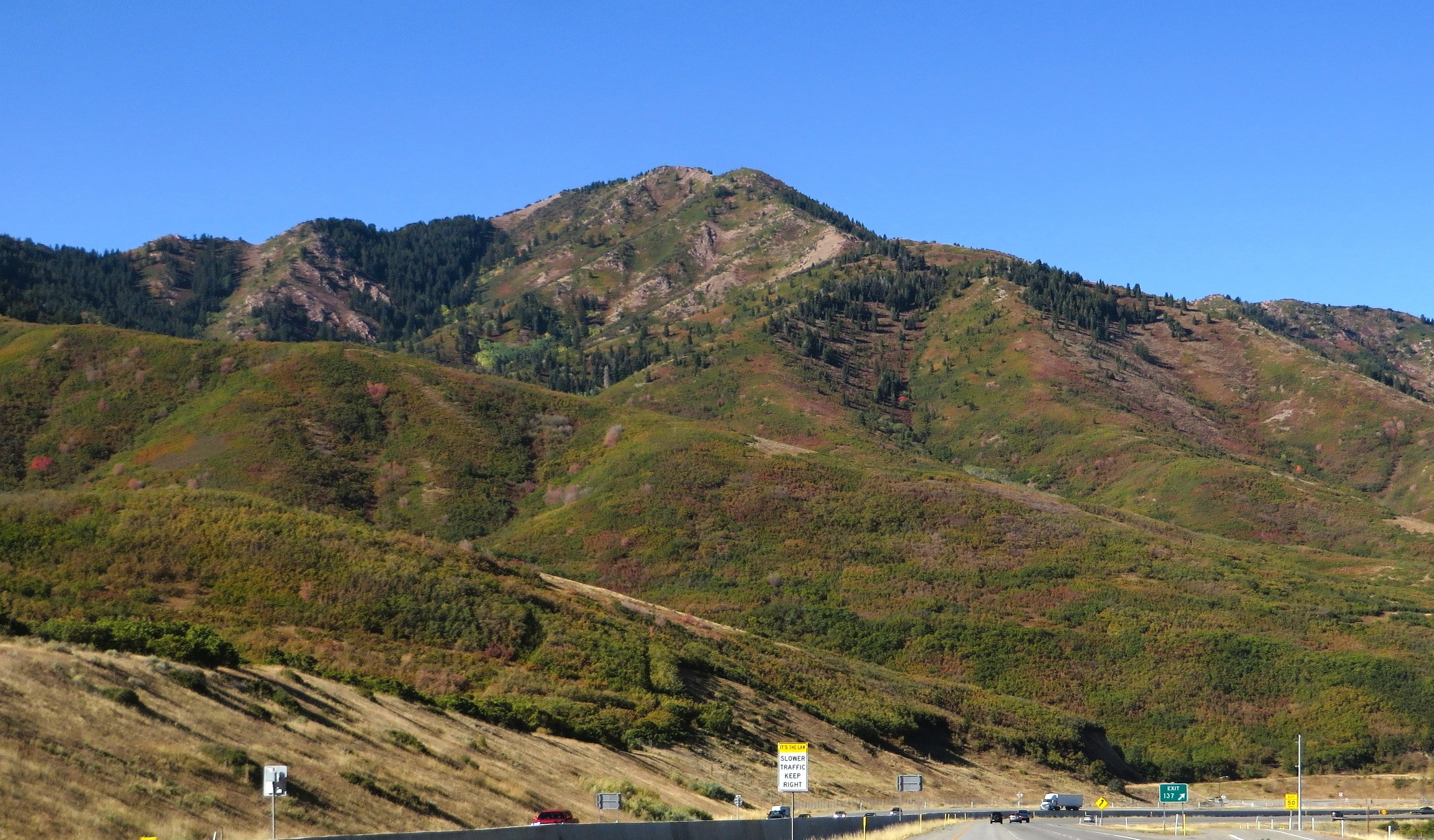
- Northeast aspect, from westbound Interstate 80

Highest point
- Elevation: 8,621 ft (2,628 m)
- Prominence: 581 ft (177 m)
- Parent peak: Peak 9074
- Isolation: 2.77 mi (4.46 km)
- Coordinates: 40°43′12″N 111°41′43″W

Geography
- Location within Utah Location within the United States
- Country: United States
- State: Utah
- County: Salt Lake
- Parent range: Wasatch Range; Rocky Mountains
- Topo map: USGS Mount Aire

Geology
- Rock type: Sedimentary rock

Climbing
- Easiest route: class 1 hiking trail

Mount Aire is an 8,621-foot-elevation (2,628-meter) mountain summit located in Salt Lake County, Utah, United States.

== Description ==
Mount Aire is located 11 miles (18 km) east-southeast of downtown Salt Lake City on land managed by Wasatch National Forest. The peak is set in the Wasatch Range which is a subset of the Rocky Mountains. Precipitation runoff from the mountain's south slope drains to Mill Creek, whereas the other slopes drain to Parleys Creek. Topographic relief is significant as the summit rises over 2,600 feet (792 meters) above Parleys Canyon in 1.5 mile (2.4 km). Reaching the top involves 3.8 miles (round-trip) of trail hiking with 1,987 feet of elevation gain, and the summit provides excellent views of the surrounding mountains. This mountain's toponym has been officially adopted by the United States Board on Geographic Names. "Mount Aire" is also the name of the area of summer homes in Mount Aire Canyon immediately northwest of the summit.

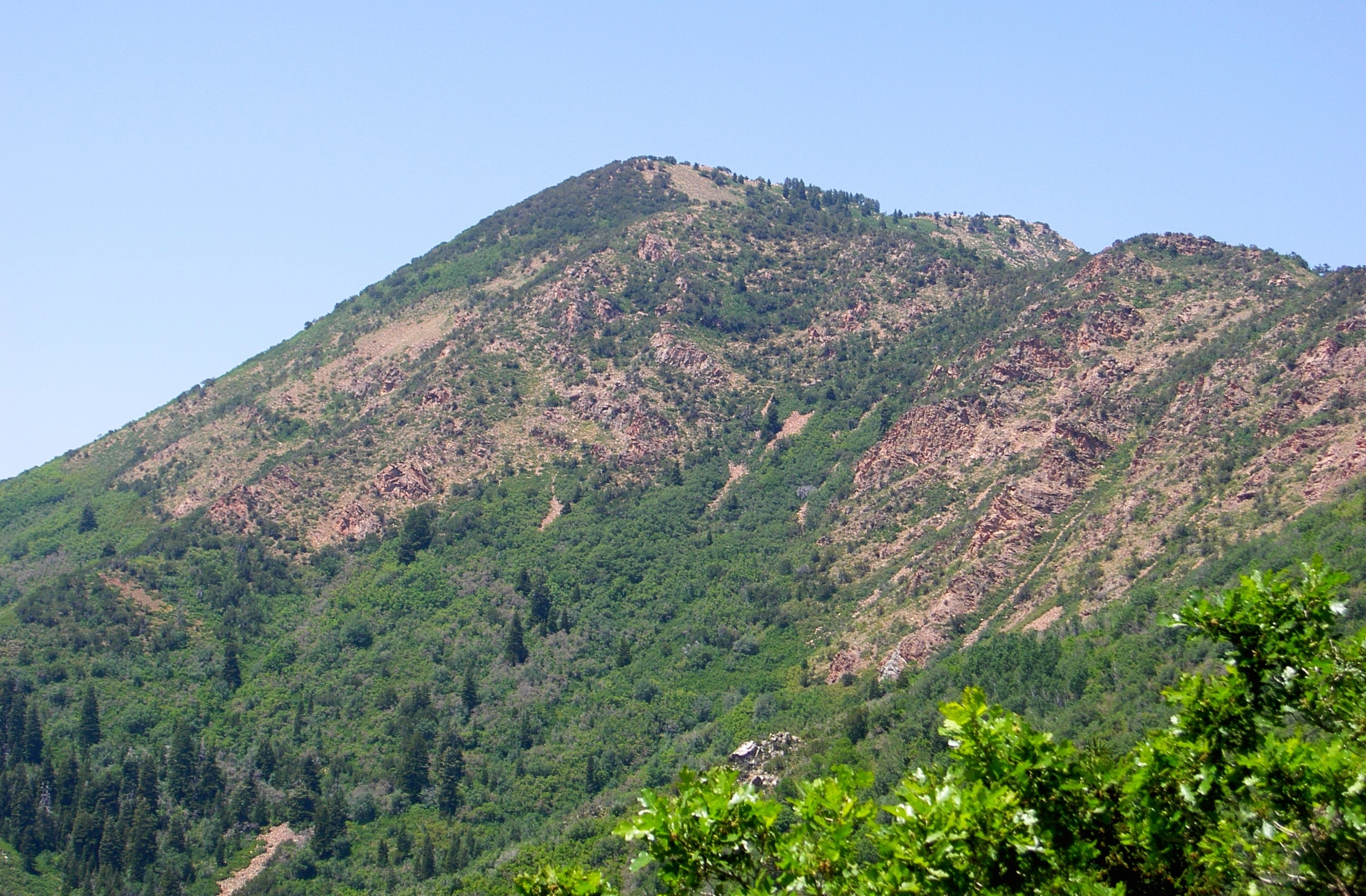
Southeast aspect
