= Airedale Academy =

Academy school in Castleford, West Yorkshire, England

Location
- Crewe Road; Castleford, West Yorkshire, WF10 3JU; England
- Coordinates: 53°43′16″N 1°18′44″W

Information
- Type: Academy
- Motto: Care Aspire Succeed
- Established: 1960
- Local authority: City of Wakefield
- Department for Education URN: 136613 Tables
- Ofsted: Reports
- Chair of Academy Council: Ali Crompton
- Principal: Andy Percival
- Gender: Coeducational
- Age: 11 to 16
- Enrolment: 1025
- Houses: None
- Colours: Gold & Black
- Website: http://www.airedaleacademy.com

Airedale Academy (formerly known as Airedale High School) is a secondary school and sixth form on Crewe Road in a suburb of Castleford in West Yorkshire, England. Castleford Academy Trust recently merged with Northern Ambition Academies Trust. Castleford Academy Trust now has 9 schools. 3 secondary Academies and 6 Primary.

== Admissions ==
It teaches children from 11–16. It was recently given the status of Arts College for its performing arts.

== History ==
In February 1995, the school suffered its first arson attack, in which a large teaching block was lost.

In June 2003, arsonists burnt down part of the lower school, causing £1 million of damage. The refurbishment after the fire was officially opened in September 2005.

Another arson attack occurred on 17 January 2006. Around 100 firefighters attended the blaze. It destroyed three drama studios and the upper school's main hall. A new state of the art Drama department and theatre (Castleford Phoenix Theatre) was officially opened in October 2008.

In the academic year 2011–12, Airedale Academy took its first cohort of sixth form students in at AS Level. In late 2011, Principal, Paul Frazer, left and, Michaela Blackledge took his place.

In early 2016, Principal, Micheala Blackledge, left and, Elizabeth Fairhurst took her place.

In 2019, Elizabeth Fairhurst took up the role of CEO of the Trust and Lyndsey Proctor took her place as Principal.

In 2023, Lyndsey Proctor left her role as Principal and Dan Neal took her place as the Interim Principal.

In 2024 Cheryl Eastwood was promoted internally to Head of School, on an interim basis.

== Academic performance ==
In 2008 the school received a rating of Grade 2 (Good) from Ofsted.

== Castleford Phoenix Theatre ==
The Castleford Phoenix Theatre (at Airedale Academy), is West Yorkshire's latest Performing Art's, conference and education centre.

== Academy status ==
The school has been granted academy status and converted on 1 April 2011.

== Sixth Form ==
In the academic year 2011–12, Airedale Academy opened a satellite sixth form of Ossett Academy. The five main study areas are, Business Studies, English Literature, Performing Arts, ICT, and Health & Social Care.
