= AYR (brand) =

American women's wear brand

AYR (All Year Round) is an independent clothing brand that is known for its jeans, which are made in Los Angeles, and its elevated basics. The brand was launched online in 2014. Maggie Winter is the brand's co-founder and chief executive. In 2020, the company adopted a fully distributed operating model with a small team that works across three time zones.

AYR has been featured in Vogue, The New York Times, New York Magazine, Esquire, GQ, and Forbes.
