= Point of Ayre, Orkney =

Coordinates: 58.92°N 02.72°W

There are two other similarly named points in the British Isles: Point of Ayre, Isle of Man and Point of Ayr, Wales.

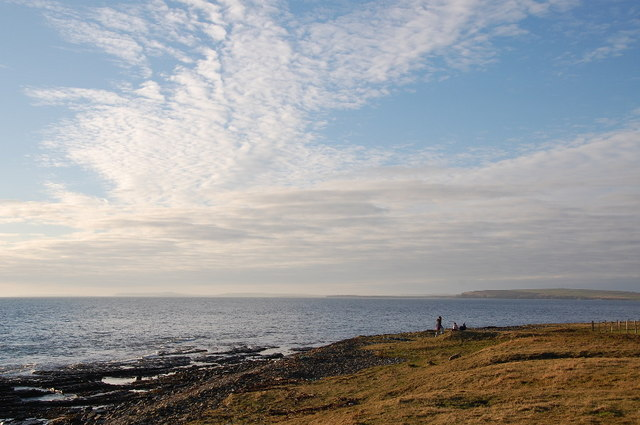
Point of Ayre, Deerness, Orkney Mainland

Point of Ayre is a headland in the parish of Deerness, in the East Mainland of Orkney, Scotland. Overlooking the strait known as the Copinsay Pass, it lies 4 miles (6 km) south of Mull Head, and around 10 miles from Kirkwall, the main town on the island.

At Point of Ayre is a seven-metre thick basalt lava flow. At its top surface are relict gas bubble holes now filled with carbonate. Lower down, the lava has weathered in an "onion-skin" or spheroidal pattern, which is an unusual feature in Orkney.
