= Ayr railway station =

Railway station in South Ayrshire, Scotland

Ayr Scottish Gaelic: Inbhir Àir
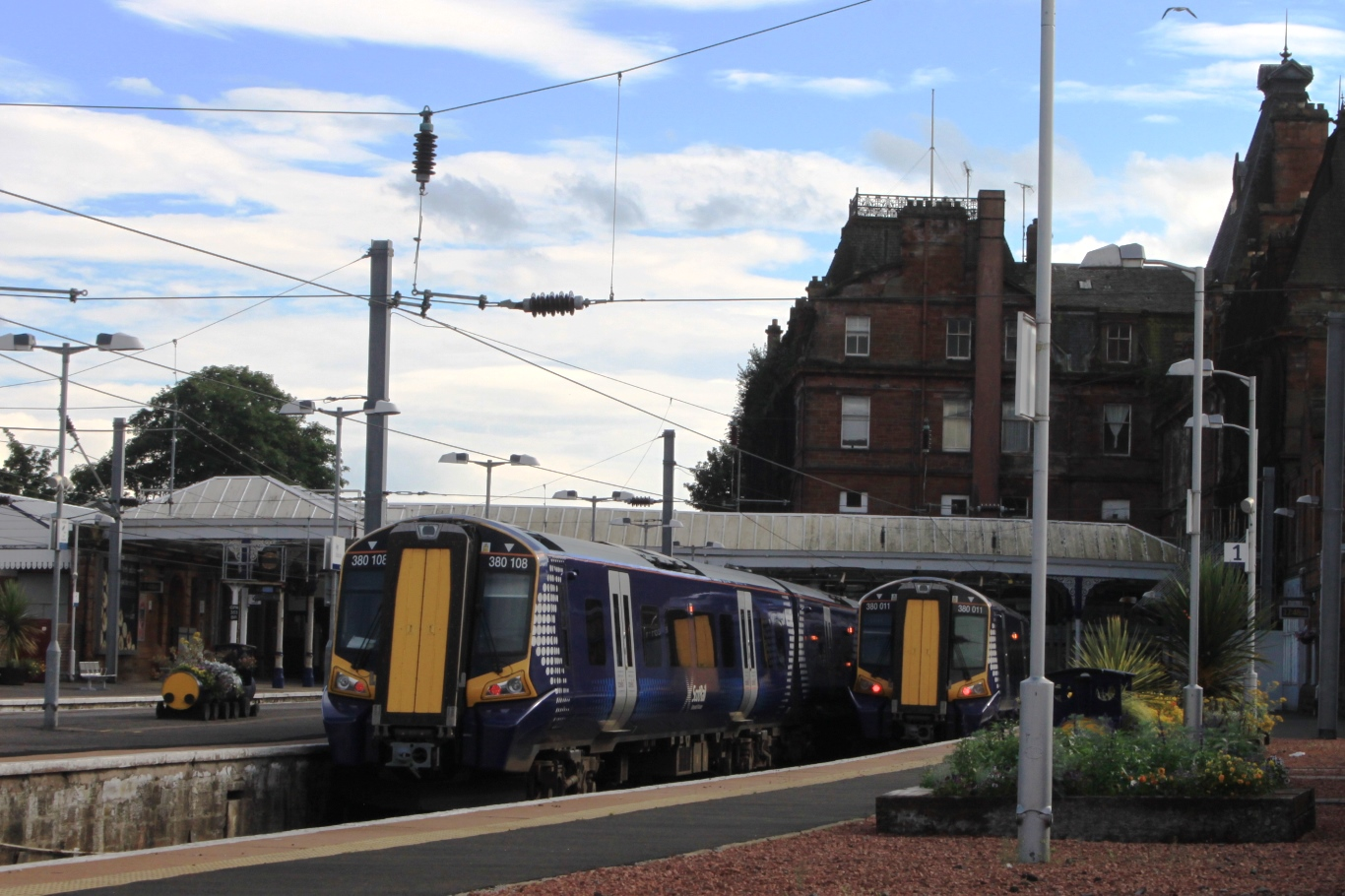
- Ayr railway station, with Abellio ScotRail Class 380s in the bay platforms

General information
- Location: Ayr, South Ayrshire; Scotland
- Coordinates: 55.4583°N 4.6258°W
- Grid reference: NS340214
- Manager: ScotRail
- Transit authority: SPT
- Platforms: 4

Other information
- Station code: AYR

Key dates
- 12 January 1886: Opened

Passengers
- 2021/22: ▲0.726 million
- Interchange: ▲30,337
- 2022/23: ▲0.821 million
- Interchange: ▲52,388
- 2023/24: ▼0.684 million
- Interchange: ▼41,806
- 2024/25: ▲0.796 million
- Interchange: ▼38,459
- 2025/26: ▲1.060 million
- Interchange: ▲69,074

Listed Building – Category B
- Designated: 10 January 1980
- Reference no.: LB21808
Location
Notes
- Passenger statistics from the Office of Rail and Road

Ayr railway station serves the town of Ayr in South Ayrshire, Scotland. It is situated in Smith Street, off Burns Statue Square. The station, which is managed by ScotRail, is on the Ayrshire Coast Line, 41 1/2 miles (66.8 km) south-west of Glasgow Central.

== History ==
The station was opened on 12 January 1886 by the Glasgow and South Western Railway. This was the third station to be named 'Ayr' in the town: the original station, located on the former Glasgow, Paisley, Kilmarnock and Ayr Railway, opened in 1839. When the Ayr and Dalmellington Railway was opened in 1856, a station called Ayr Townhead was opened on the south side of the town. When the original Ayr station was closed on 1 July 1857, Townhead station was renamed 'Ayr', however this second station closed the same day the current station opened. The current station was built just 300 yards (270 m) south of the previous station. The Glasgow and South Western Railway became part of the London Midland and Scottish Railway during the Grouping of 1923, passing on to the Scottish Region of British Railways during the nationalisation of 1948.

When sectorisation was introduced in the 1980s, the station was served by ScotRail until the privatisation of British Rail.

== Station description ==
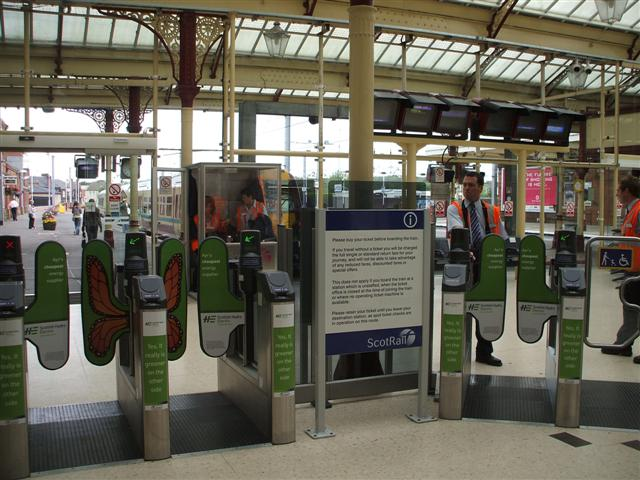
The now-relocated Northbound ticket gates in 2007

Ayr station consists of two through platforms, and two bay platforms to the north. The northbound platform station building used to be located on the ground floor of the four-storey hotel attached to the station, but has now relocated to a new-build ticket hall and entrance at the north end of the bay platform, due to the hotel building being condemned and partially destroyed. The southbound platform has a large single storey sandstone building. The glazed canopy that covers a small section of all four platforms and the waiting area was originally much larger than its current size.

The station has one of eight remaining ticket offices on the Ayr to Glasgow Central line, the others being Prestwick Town, Troon, Irvine, Kilwinning, Johnstone, Paisley Gilmour Street and Glasgow Central. In December 2006, the station received automatic ticket barriers as part of ScotRail's revenue protection policy.

South Ayrshire Council approved Network Rail plans to reopen a disused atrium at the station, in 2026.

=== Hotel ===
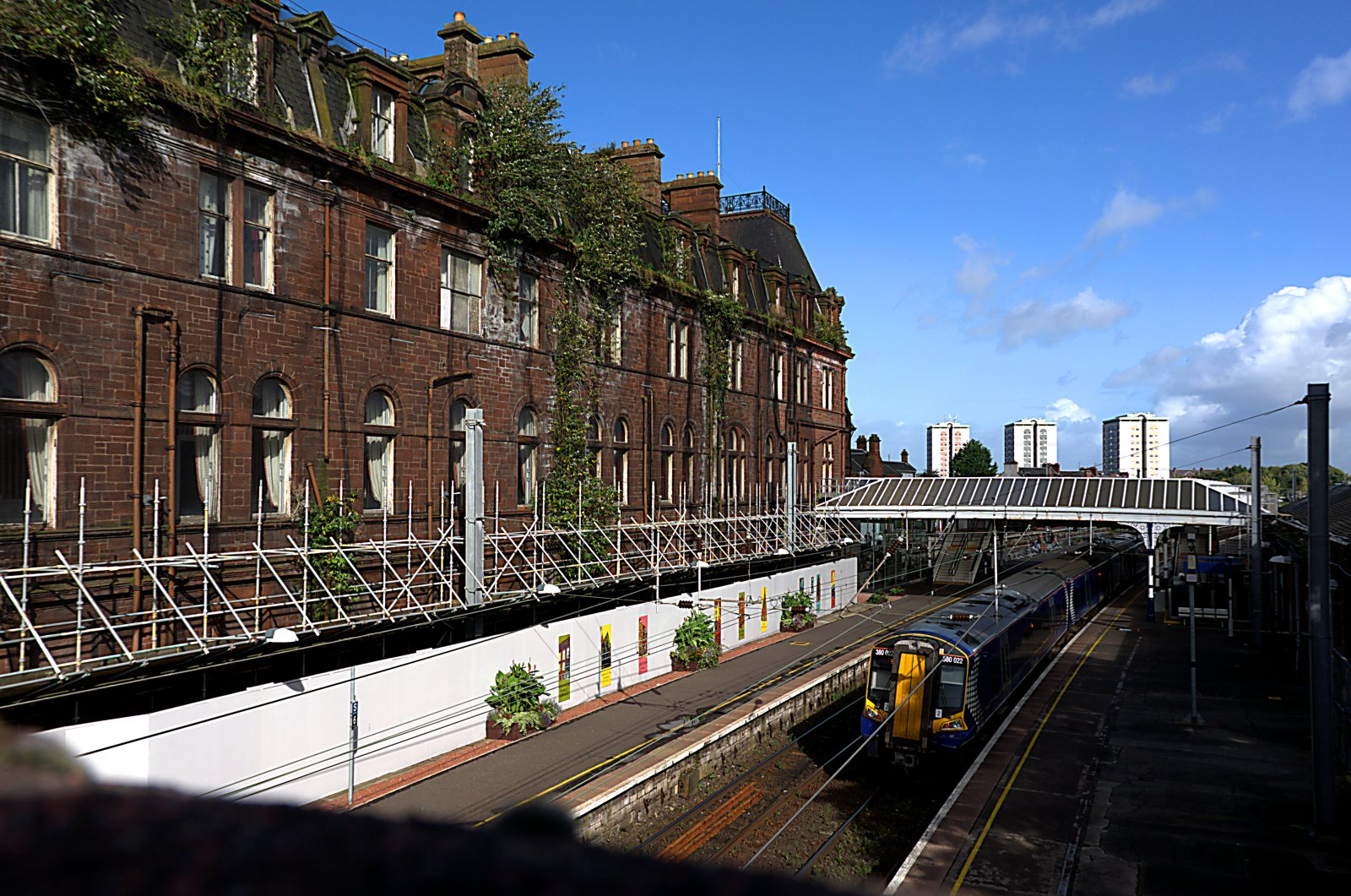
The Station Hotel in September 2017, showing buddleja growth

The hotel attached to the station was originally opened by the Glasgow and South Western Railway in June 1886 and it became part of the British Transport Hotels (BTH) at nationalisation. Future President Woodrow Wilson stayed in the hotel during his cycling trip in Britain in 1899. It was sold by BTH in October 1951 and has changed ownership a number of times, having been owned by Stakis Hotels, Quality, and Swallow Hotels. Together with the railway station building, it is a category B listed building.

The Station Hotel was derelict and was on the Buildings at Risk register for Scotland. Its poor condition had necessitated an exclusion zone that covered a portion of the station platforms and tracks. All services from Ayr to Girvan/Stranraer were operated by replacement buses due to the exclusion zone that was place around the hotel. On Monday to Saturday there was a two-hourly service from Ayr to Kilmarnock, and Ayr to Glasgow Central services ran at reduced capacity. Trains could not be longer than four carriages. On 1 November 2018, ScotRail reinstated the service from Ayr to Stranraer. The first service was the first train to run south of Ayr for two months.

On 25 September 2023, a severe blaze ripped through the building, destroying the roof and causing extensive damage to the interior. The fire resulted in severe rail disruptions throughout the Ayrshire region, with stations inactive as far north as Irvine and as far south as Girvan. Following demolition work to the hotel, Ayr station reopened to trains on 17 June 2024.

== Services ==
The current service at Ayr is as follows:

=== Monday to Saturdays ===
- Northbound (Ayrshire Coast Line): There is a half-hourly limited-stop service to Glasgow Central, with additional peak-hour services.
- Northbound (Glasgow South Western Line): There are nine departures per day to Kilmarnock operating at an irregular hourly or two-hourly frequency. One of these services continues onward to Glasgow Central.
- Southbound: There is a mostly hourly service to Girvan, with some two-hour gaps. Five of these trains per day continue past Girvan and terminate at Stranraer.

=== Sundays ===
- Northbound: There is a half-hourly service to Glasgow Central. There are no Sunday services to Kilmarnock.
- Southbound: There is a limited service of five trains a day to Stranraer.

Preceding station	National Rail	Following station
Terminus	ScotRail; Ayrshire Coast Line	Newton-on-Ayr
Maybole	ScotRail; Glasgow South Western Line	Prestwick Town
	Historical railways	
AllowayLine and station closed	Glasgow and South Western Railway; Maidens and Dunure Railway	Connection with A&DR at Alloway Junction
Maybole Junction; Line open; station closed	Glasgow and South Western Railway; Ayr and Dalmellington Railway	Newton-on-Ayr; Line and station open
Connection with A&DR at Hawkhill Junction	Glasgow and South Western Railway; Ayr to Mauchline Branch	Auchincruive; Line open; station closed

== Ferries ==
Stena Line passengers travelling on through "Rail & Sail" tickets to Belfast are provided with a free coach service direct from Ayr station to Cairnryan. This departs from outside the main entrance.

Preceding station	National Rail	Following station
Cairnryan Harbour (via connecting coach or Stranraer)	Stena Line; Cairnryan-Belfast	York Street or Belfast Grand Central (via Port of Belfast)
Cairnryan Harbour (via Stranraer)	P&O Ferries; Cairnryan-Larne	Larne Harbour

== Bibliography ==
- Brailsford, Martyn, ed. (December 2017) [1987]. Railway Track Diagrams 1: Scotland & Isle of Man (6th ed.). Frome: Trackmaps. ISBN 978-0-9549866-9-8.
- Butt, R. V. J. (October 1995). The Directory of Railway Stations: details every public and private passenger station, halt, platform and stopping place, past and present (1st ed.). Sparkford: Patrick Stephens Ltd. ISBN 978-1-85260-508-7. OCLC 60251199. OL 11956311M.
- Carter, Oliver (1990). An illustrated history of British Railway Hotels: 1838-1983. St Michael's: Silver Link Publishing. ISBN 0-947971-36-X.
- Hume, John R. (1976). The Industrial Archaeology of Scotland, Vol. 1: The Lowlands and Borders. London: B. T. Batsford Ltd. ISBN 0-7134-3234-9.
