= Ayr railway station (1839–1857) =

Disused railway station in Ayr, Ayrshire

Ayr
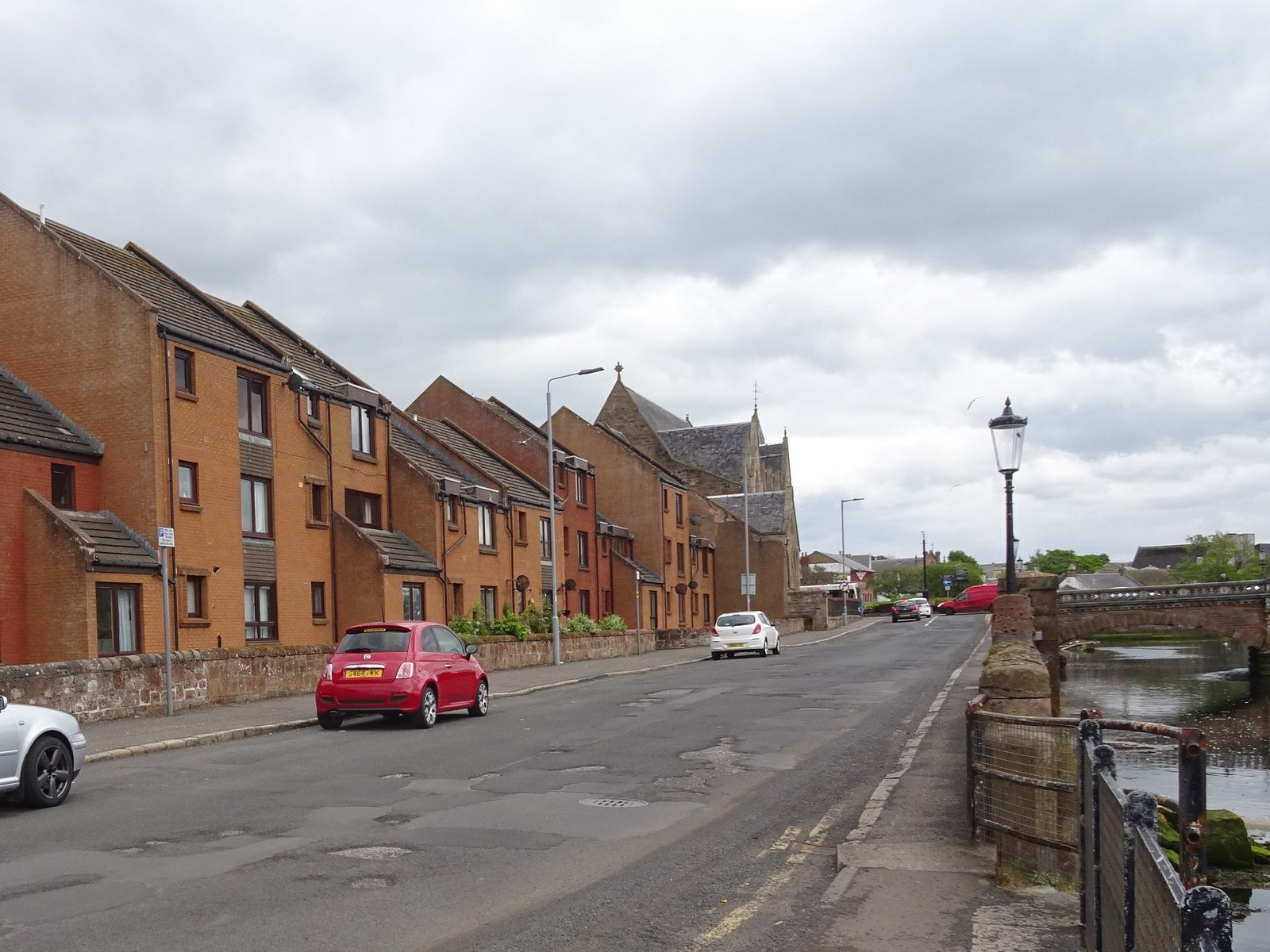
- The site of the station in 2019

General information
- Location: Ayr, Ayrshire; Scotland
- Coordinates: 55.4666°N 4.6317°W
- Grid reference: NS336223
- Platforms: 2

Other information
- Status: Disused

History
- Original company: Glasgow, Paisley, Kilmarnock and Ayr Railway
- Pre-grouping: Glasgow and South Western Railway

Key dates
- 5 August 1839: Opened
- 1 July 1857: Closed
Location

Ayr railway station was a railway station serving the town of Ayr, South Ayrshire, Scotland. The station was originally part of the Glasgow, Paisley, Kilmarnock and Ayr Railway. From October 1850, it became part of the Glasgow and South Western Railway.

== History ==
The terminus station opened on 5 August 1839, and closed to passengers on 1 July 1857 upon opening of the new Ayr Townhead station. The station however continued to be used by goods traffic, and in 1899 a viaduct was built to continue the line from here across the river to access the south side of the harbour.

Today almost nothing of the station remains. The stone blocks that held up the 1899 bridge to the harbour can still be seen in the River Ayr, but the bridge itself was removed in 1978.

Preceding station	Historical railways	Following station
Terminus	Glasgow and South Western Railway; Glasgow, Paisley, Kilmarnock and Ayr Railway	Prestwick; Line partially closed; station open
