= Charles Roach (priest) =

Archdeacon of the Seychelles from 1951 to 1955 (1908–2003)

Charles Roach (2 June 1908 – 4 May 2003) was Archdeacon of the Seychelles from 1951 until 1955.

Born in Shrewsbury, Shropshire, in 1908, Roach was educated at De Aston Grammar School, Sidney Sussex College, Cambridge and Westcott House, Cambridge. After a curacy at Boston parish church he was a Chaplain in Baghdad. After this, he was the incumbent at Emmanuel, West Dulwich, before his subsequent appointment as Archdeacon and St Saviour, Croydon. His final post was as Chaplain at St Michael's Mount. He died in Marazion, Cornwall, in 2003, aged 94.
