= Richard P. Cook =

English artist (born 1949)

Richard P. Cook RBA
- Born: Richard Peter Cook; 27 February 1949 (age 77); Grimsby, Lincolnshire, England, United Kingdom
- Education: Grimsby School of Art (1965–68) Painting and Sculpture; Maidstone College of Art (1968–71) GDip in Art and Design William Bowyer, Fred Cuming and Alex Koolman; Royal Academy Schools (1972–75) PGDip in Fine Art Peter Greenham
- Known for: Painting; portraiture; landscapes; teaching
- Spouse: Christine Cook
- Children: 2
- Awards: David Murray Landscape Award (1974); Elizabeth T. Greenshields Award (1975); Richard Ford Travelling Scholarship (1984); Reynolds Club Watercolour Award (2015)
- Elected: Royal Society of British Artists ARBA 1975 RBA 1976
- Website: richardpcook.co.uk

Richard Peter Cook RBA (born 1949 in Grimsby) is an English portrait and landscape artist working predominantly in oils and watercolour. Graduating from the Royal Academy Schools in 1975, he was elected an associate of the Royal Society of British Artists the same year, becoming a full member in 1976.

== Biography ==
Cook was born in the fishing town of Grimsby. He studied painting and sculpture at the local Grimsby School of Art, before moving to Maidstone. There, he was taught by painters William Bowyer, Fred Cuming, and Alex Koolman at Maidstone College of Art. Cook was invited to complete a three-year postgraduate course at the Royal Academy Schools in London, where he was influenced by his tutor, the Keeper of the RA Schools and leading portraitist, Peter Greenham. Encouraged by William Bowyer, Cook applied to the Royal Society of British Artists' annual exhibitions, and his work was selected in 1973 and 1974. Cook was then nominated by Bowyer for membership to the society, becoming an associate member in 1975 and promoted to a full member in 1976. In 1980 Cook was invited to hold a solo exhibition at the RA Schools Galleries.

Cook volunteered to demonstrate portraiture and landscape painting for a decade at Art in Action at Waterperry between 1989 and 1999. He later taught at Lancing College between 2007 and 2019.

Cook lives and works in Brighton, East Sussex, with his wife, Christine Cook; they have two daughters, Naomi and Saskia.

== Art ==
″I prefer to work from life, often drawing on the spot, making colour notes in the case of landscape or even very basic watercolour sketches to catch the light, colour and atmosphere. For oils, I enjoy working on acrylic gesso primed canvas - linen preferably, with a fairly fine tooth. Drawing basic geometry of the composition in charcoal or soft pencil is the first job, after which I strengthen the line with dark umber. I build up the paint, thick and thin, with hog hair and sable, using a cloth for blending. Landscapes can take days or weeks depending on how much I nag at them. Portraits can take longer because its very important to me and the sitter to get a likeness that pleases us both.″ — Richard P. Cook

Portrait of Dame Beryl Paston Brown (1909–1997), Principal of Homerton College (1961–1971). Painted by Richard P. Cook in 1986 and held in the permanent collection of Homerton College, Cambridge University.

Cityscape Spring Afternoon on the Thames by Richard P. Cook. Including (L-R) London Eye, River Thames and the Palace of Westminster including Big Ben.

== Selected exhibitions ==
=== Solo ===
1980 — Richard Cook RBA: Paintings, Drawings and Watercolours, Royal Academy Schools' Gallery, Royal Academy of Arts, London

With exhibition catalogue.

=== Group ===
1973– — Summer Exhibition, Royal Academy of Arts, London

(Ten exhibitions: 1973, 1976–81, 1983, 1993 and 1996)

1973– — Annual Exhibition, Royal Society of British Artists, Mall Galleries, London

(Fifty-two exhibitions: 1973–2024 inclusive)

1984 — John Player Portrait Award, National Portrait Gallery, London

Cook's portrait of his wife, Christine in a Red Dress was selected for the exhibition.

1991– — Sunday Times Watercolour Competition, Mall Galleries, London

(Six exhibitions: 1991, 1993 and 1996 as the Kaupthing Singer & Friedlander / Sunday Times Watercolour Competition, then 2008, 2014 and 2019 as the RWS/Sunday Times Watercolour Competition)
Traveling to Birmingham, Manchester and Leeds.

2022 — Winners: Award Winning Artists 2020-2022, Mall Galleries, London

Inaugural biannual Federation of British Artists exhibition, inviting prizewinners from its constituent arts societies to exhibit new work.

Laing Landscape Exhibition, Mall Galleries, London

(Three exhibitions)

Other selected group exhibitions at the New English Art Club, Royal Watercolour Society, Royal Society of Portrait Painters, Royal Institute of Painters in Water Colours, Royal Overseas League, Bankside Gallery, Towner Eastbourne and Brighton Festival.

== Awards ==
1974 — Sir David Murray Landscape Award, Royal Academy Schools
1975 — Elizabeth T. Greenshields Award (Travelling Scholarship to France and Portugal)
1982 — Richard Ford Travelling Scholarship (Prado Museum, Spain)

Administered by the Royal Academy of Arts and Sir Brinsley Ford.

1989 — First and Third Prize, Art Pavilion, Royal Bath and West Show
1991 — Second Prize, Art Pavilion, Royal Bath and West Show
2015 — Winsor & Newton Watercolour Award, Reynolds Club

The Reynolds Club is an association of past students of the Royal Academy Schools, it was founded in 1949 and named after Sir Joshua Reynolds.

2023 — Michael Harding Art Materials Award, Royal Society of British Artists

== Collections ==
- Homerton College, University of Cambridge
  - Portrait of Dame Beryl Paston Brown (1909–1997), Principal of Homerton College (1961–1971), painted in 1986.
  - Portrait of Jean Holm, painted in 1999.
- Manchester Art Gallery
  - View from the Studio (1984)
