= List of listed buildings in Troon, South Ayrshire =

This is a list of listed buildings in the parish of Troon, in South Ayrshire, Scotland.

== List ==
Name	Location	Date Listed	Grid Ref. (Note: Sometimes known as OSGB36, the grid reference (where provided) is based on the British national grid reference system used by the Ordnance Survey. • "Guide to National Grid". Ordnance Survey. • "Get-a-map". Ordnance Survey.)	Geo-coordinates	Notes	LB Number (Note: Historic Environment Scotland assign a unique alphanumeric identifier to each designated site in Scotland, for listed buildings this always begins with "LB", for example "LB12345".)	Image
116, 118 And 120 Welbeck Crescent Including Boundary Wall And Piers				55°32′33″N 4°40′19″W	Category C(S)	45264	Upload Photo
9 And 11 Yorke Road Including Boundary Wall				55°32′21″N 4°39′17″W	Category C(S)	45265	Upload Photo
25A, 25B And 25C Bentinck Drive, Brandon House Including Boundary Wall				55°32′29″N 4°39′24″W	Category C(S)	45246	Upload Photo
137 Bentinck Drive, Rowallan, Including Boundary Wall And Gatepiers				55°32′04″N 4°38′54″W	Category C(S)	45247	Upload Photo
11 Crosbie Road, Mokoia, Including Terrace, Boundary Wall And Gatepiers				55°31′48″N 4°38′48″W	Category C(S)	45253	Upload Photo
Bentinck Drive, St Ninian's Episcopal Church Including Lych Gate, Rear Boundary Wall And Piers				55°32′17″N 4°39′10″W	Category B	42109	Upload another image See more images
134 Bentinck Drive, Scotswood, Including Boundary Walls, Gatepiers And Gates				55°32′04″N 4°38′59″W	Category C(S)	42110	Upload Photo
Dundonald Road, Lodge At Entrance To Marr College				55°32′47″N 4°38′44″W	Category C(S)	42117	Upload Photo
Isle Of Pin Road, Fullarton Courtyard Including Sundial				55°32′13″N 4°37′27″W	Category B	42121	Upload Photo
Monktonhill Road, Ruins Of Crosbie Church And Churchyard Including Boundary Wall, Gatepiers And Gates				55°31′51″N 4°37′30″W	Category B	42123	Upload Photo
South Beach, Town Hall Including Lamp Standards				55°32′33″N 4°39′46″W	Category B	42136	Upload another image
48, 48A And 50 South Beach Including Boundary Walls				55°32′25″N 4°39′29″W	Category C(S)	42144	Upload Photo
56 South Beach, Elmslie, Including Boundary Walls, Gatepiers, Former Gig-House And 2A Victoria Drive, Groom Cottage				55°32′22″N 4°39′27″W	Category B	42145	Upload Photo
79 South Beach, Cairnsaigh Including Boundary Wall And Gatepiers				55°32′18″N 4°39′16″W	Category C(S)	45261	Upload Photo
70 Bentinck Drive, St Ninian's Rectory Including Boundary Wall				55°32′19″N 4°39′13″W	Category C(S)	45249	Upload Photo
130 And 130A Bentinck Drive, Terrydale And Kirkland, Including Boundary Wall And Piers				55°32′06″N 4°39′00″W	Category C(S)	45250	Upload Photo
40 And 42 Bradan Road Including Outbuilding				55°32′38″N 4°40′07″W	Category C(S)	45251	Upload Photo
15 Crosbie Road, Including Sunken Garden Walls, Boundary Wall And Gatepiers				55°31′46″N 4°38′46″W	Category C(S)	45254	Upload Photo
Fullarton Park, Gatepiers And Outer Piers (4 Pins) Original East Entrance To Fullarton House				55°32′11″N 4°37′17″W	Category C(S)	45256	Upload Photo
69 And 71 Portland Street, Mckays Public House				55°32′43″N 4°39′42″W	Category C(S)	45258	Upload Photo
2 Bentinck Drive, Advie Lodge And 12 St Meddans Street, Including Boundary Walls				55°32′33″N 4°39′33″W	Category B	42107	Upload Photo
Isle Of Pin Road, Fullarton Park, Two Pedestals At Site Of Former Fullarton House				55°32′14″N 4°37′27″W	Category B	42122	Upload another image
125 And 125A Portland Street Including Boundary Wall And Piers				55°32′48″N 4°39′31″W	Category C(S)	42124	Upload Photo
4 Cessnock Road, Roman Catholic Presbytery Adjoining Church Of Our Lady Of The Assumption And St Meddan, St Meddans Street				55°32′41″N 4°39′12″W	Category B	42130	Upload Photo
1 South Beach And 6 Academy Street				55°32′34″N 4°39′44″W	Category C(S)	42131	Upload Photo
117 South Beach, Including Boundary Wall, Entrance Arch And Gatepiers				55°32′10″N 4°39′10″W	Category B	42132	Upload Photo
135 And 137 South Beach Including Boundary Wall And Gatepiers				55°32′05″N 4°39′07″W	Category C(S)	42134	Upload Photo
30 And 30A South Beach, Craigronach And Fin Me Oot, Including Boundary Walls				55°32′29″N 4°39′37″W	Category B	42140	Upload Photo
68 And 68A South Beach, Loanhead, Including Boundary Walls				55°32′19″N 4°39′22″W	Category B	42147	Upload Photo
17 Crosbie Road, Cessford, Including Sunken Garden Walls, Boundary Wall And Gatepiers				55°31′44″N 4°38′43″W	Category B	42161	Upload Photo
3 Craigend Road, Belhaven Nursing Home Including Boundary Wall, Railings And Piers				55°32′00″N 4°38′59″W	Category C(S)	45252	Upload Photo
19 Crosbie Road, Real Tennis Court Adjoining Sun Court Nursing Home				55°31′43″N 4°38′39″W	Category C(S)	45255	Upload Photo
Isle Of Pin Road, Stone Pillar (Within Boundary Of Monkland)				55°32′09″N 4°37′51″W	Category C(S)	45257	Upload another image
15 Craigend Road, Piersland House Hotel (Formerly Piersland Lodge), Including Summer Houses, Terrace And Columns				55°32′02″N 4°38′49″W	Category A	42114	Upload Photo
Crosbie Road, Puma Hotels Collection's The Marine Hotel Including Terrace Wall, Piers And Gate				55°31′54″N 4°38′55″W	Category C(S)	42115	Upload Photo
Dundonald Road, Four Gatepiers At Entrance To Marr College				55°32′43″N 4°38′44″W	Category C(S)	42118	Upload Photo
Dundonald Road, Former Janitor's House, Marr College				55°32′54″N 4°38′41″W	Category C(S)	42119	Upload Photo
St Meddans Street, Catholic Church Of Our Lady Of The Assumption And St Meddan Including Passage And Boundary Wall				55°32′42″N 4°39′13″W	Category A	42129	Upload another image
26 South Beach, Inchanga, Including Boundary Walls And Piers				55°32′30″N 4°39′39″W	Category C(S)	42138	Upload Photo
70 And 70A South Beach				55°32′18″N 4°39′20″W	Category C(S)	42148	Upload Photo
1 Wood Road, Former Miners' Institute Including Boundary Wall And Piers				55°32′35″N 4°40′22″W	Category C(S)	42159	Upload Photo
55 And 55A St Meddans Street Including Boundary Wall And Gatepiers				55°32′42″N 4°39′20″W	Category C(S)	45260	Upload Photo
10 Victoria Drive Including Boundary Walls				55°32′25″N 4°39′21″W	Category C(S)	45263	Upload Photo
10 And 12 Yorke Road Including Boundary Wall				55°32′19″N 4°39′14″W	Category C(S)	45266	Upload Photo
51-59 (Odd Nos) Ayr Street And 5 And 7 Academy Street, Including The Royal Bank Of Scotland				55°32′35″N 4°39′45″W	Category B	45242	Upload Photo
Barassie Street, Troon Primary School Including No 39 Barassie Street (Janitors House), Outbuildings, Boundary Walls, Railings, Gatepiers And Gates				55°32′43″N 4°39′30″W	Category C(S)	45243	Upload Photo
58 Bentinck Drive, The Hermitage, Including Boundary Wall And Gatepiers				55°32′21″N 4°39′15″W	Category C(S)	45248	Upload Photo
Ayr Street, Troon Old Parish Church (Church Of Scotland) Including Boundary Walls, Gatepiers And Gates				55°32′34″N 4°39′48″W	Category B	42102	Upload Photo
121 And 121A Bentinck Drive Including Boundary Wall, Entrance Gateway And Piers				55°32′10″N 4°38′59″W	Category C(S)	42104	Upload Photo
133 And 135 Bentinck Drive And 37 Bentinck Crescent Including Boundary Wall, Entrance Arches And Gates				55°32′04″N 4°38′55″W	Category C(S)	42105	Upload Photo
139-145 (Odd Nos) Bentinck Drive, Piersland Mews Including Boundary Wall And Piers				55°32′03″N 4°38′54″W	Category C(S)	42106	Upload Photo
82, 84 And 86 Portland Street				55°32′43″N 4°39′38″W	Category C(S)	42125	Upload Photo
St Meddans Street, Portland Church (Church Of Scotland) And Church Halls Including Boundary Wall, Piers And Gates				55°32′31″N 4°39′36″W	Category B	42128	Upload another image See more images
58 Alton Lodge And 60 South Beach Including Boundary Walls And Piers				55°32′22″N 4°39′25″W	Category C(S)	42146	Upload Photo
93 And 95 Templehill				55°32′39″N 4°40′03″W	Category B	42152	Upload Photo
West Portland Street, Seagate Evangelical Church, Former Bethany Chapel				55°32′35″N 4°39′53″W	Category B	42158	Upload Photo
Troon Harbour Including North Pier, Harbour Walls, Graving Docks And Wet Dock				55°32′52″N 4°40′50″W	Category B	45262	Upload Photo
Bentinck Crescent, Shandwick, Including Boundary Wall, Piers And Gates				55°32′11″N 4°38′47″W	Category C(S)	45245	Upload Photo
9 Craigend Road, Piersland Gatehouse, Former West Lodge To Piersland Lodge (Now Piersland House Hotel), Including Boundary Wall, Piers And Gatepiers				55°32′00″N 4°38′54″W	Category B	42113	Upload Photo
St Meddans Street, St Meddans Parish Church (Church Of Scotland) And Church Hall Including Boundary Wall And Piers				55°32′34″N 4°39′36″W	Category B	42126	Upload another image See more images
28 South Beach, Dolphin Cottage, Including Boundary Walls				55°32′30″N 4°39′38″W	Category C(S)	42139	Upload Photo
149 Templehill, Anchorage Hotel				55°32′39″N 4°40′10″W	Category C(S)	42153	Upload Photo
Harbour Road, Retail Premises And Dwellings, Former Harbour Office And Custom House, Including Rear Walls				55°32′53″N 4°41′04″W	Category C(S)	42156	Upload Photo
Troon Railway Station				55°32′34″N 4°39′19″W	Category B	42157	Upload another image See more images
46 South Beach Including Boundary Walls And Piers				55°32′25″N 4°39′30″W	Category B	42143	Upload Photo
Ayr Street, Former Parish Church, Now Old Parish Church Hall Including Boundary Wall				55°32′35″N 4°39′49″W	Category B	42101	Upload Photo
2 Craigend Road, Royal Troon Golf Club Including Boundary Walls And Gatepiers				55°31′58″N 4°39′03″W	Category C(S)	42112	Upload Photo
Dundonald Road, Marr College (Main Block) Including Front Terrace Walls, Lamp Standards And Steps				55°32′56″N 4°38′43″W	Category B	42116	Upload Photo
South Beach, Crosbie Tower Including Conservatory, Boundary Wall, Piers And Gates				55°32′03″N 4°39′06″W	Category B	42135	Upload Photo
36 South Beach Including Boundary Walls				55°32′27″N 4°39′33″W	Category C(S)	42141	Upload Photo
155 Templehill, Bank House Including Boundary Walls And Piers				55°32′39″N 4°40′12″W	Category B	42154	Upload Photo
41 Barassie Street, Former Tinnion Nursing Home, Including Boundary Wall, Gatepiers And Gates				55°32′41″N 4°39′31″W	Category C(S)	45244	Upload Photo
127, 129 And 131 Portland Street Including Boundary Wall And Piers				55°32′49″N 4°39′30″W	Category C(S)	45259	Upload Photo
64 Bentinck Drive, Welbeck House Including Boundary Walls And Piers				55°32′20″N 4°39′13″W	Category B	42108	Upload Photo
Isle Of Pin Road, Fullarton Park, Grotto				55°32′19″N 4°37′26″W	Category B	42120	Upload Photo
85 St Meddans Street, Stanmore, Including Boundary Wall And Gate				55°32′45″N 4°39′12″W	Category C(S)	42127	Upload Photo
South Beach Esplanade, War Memorial				55°32′31″N 4°39′45″W		42137	Upload another image See more images
72 South Beach, Including Boundary Walls				55°32′17″N 4°39′20″W	Category B	42149	Upload Photo
74 South Beach, Arranview, Including Boundary Walls				55°32′17″N 4°39′19″W	Category B	42150	Upload Photo
76 And 76A South Beach, Including Boundary Walls				55°32′16″N 4°39′18″W	Category B	42151	Upload Photo

== Key ==
The scheme for classifying buildings in Scotland is:

- Category A: "buildings of national or international importance, either architectural or historic; or fine, little-altered examples of some particular period, style or building type."
- Category B: "buildings of regional or more than local importance; or major examples of some particular period, style or building type, which may have been altered."
- Category C: "buildings of local importance; lesser examples of any period, style, or building type, as originally constructed or moderately altered; and simple traditional buildings which group well with other listed buildings."

In March 2016 there were 47,288 listed buildings in Scotland. Of these, 8% were Category A, and 50% were Category B, with the remaining 42% being Category C.
