= George Rowlett =

British painter (1941–2026)

- Born: 29 June 1941; Troon, Ayrshire, Scotland
- Died: 18 June 2026 (aged 84)
- Education: Grimsby School of Art; Camberwell School of Arts and Crafts; Royal Academy Schools
- Known for: Painting
- Movement: Landscape painting, Impasto

George Goldie Rowlett (29 June 1941 – 18 June 2026) was a British painter, best known for landscapes created with thick layers of oil paint. He was a student of Frank Auerbach and Euan Uglow and among many awards won the Lynn Painter-Stainers Prize in 2012.

== Early life and education ==
George Rowlett was born in Troon, Ayrshire on 29 June 1941. He lived with his mother and her parents in Kilmun until he was ten when he moved with his family to Lincolnshire. Rowlett went to the De Aston Grammar School in Market Rasen.

When Rowlett was seven he created a book of wildflower watercolours. Later, while attending grammar school, he was inspired by reproductions of Vincent van Gogh's work and began experimenting with watercolour and gouache in a similar style.

Rowlett left school at 16 and worked as a forester. During a year of hospital treatment following a motorcycle accident he read van Gogh's letters which inspired him to pursue a career in art. By the age of 19, in 1960, he had saved sufficiently to pay his way on a course at Grimsby School of Art, where he had friends in common with John Hurt. At Grimsby Peter Todd encouraged Rowlett to study in London, to which he moved in 1962, first studying at Camberwell and from 1965 to 1968 at the Royal Academy Schools. His teachers in London included Euan Uglow, Frank Auerbach and Peter Greenham. He won many prizes and awards during the time of his studies.

== Career and style ==
Having initially painted with oils on canvas, over time as the thickness of paint that he applied increased, Rowlett found that thick oil paint applied to canvas cracked, prompting a transition to painting on wooden boards. His favourite subjects included still-life, gardens, portraits and views of the Thames, both in London and Kent which he painted en plein air. He had no car and was known for transporting his paint and boards by bicycle.

== Death ==
Rowlett died on 18 June 2026, aged 84.

== Selected exhibitions ==
=== Solo exhibitions ===
- Grimsby Museum, Grimsby (1962)
- Cleveland Bridge Gallery, Bath (1989)
- Albemarle Gallery, London (1990)
- Art Space Gallery, London (from 1993)
- The Art Shop, Abergavenny (2005)
- East Kent and the River Thames, Art Space Gallery, London (2013)
- Rowlett also held solo exhibitions internationally in Chicago, Germany and Johannesburg

=== Group exhibitions ===
Including at the Hayward, National Portrait Gallery, Royal Academy and in North America.

== Public collections ==
- Grimsby Museum
- St Andrews University
- the British Council
- Cleveland Museum Service
- Northern Arts
- Nuffield Foundation

== Awards and honours ==
- Samuel Jones Fellowship (1965–67)
- David Murray Travelling Scholarship (1966)
- Auerbach Criticism Prize (1966)
- RA Schools Silver Medal for Painting (1967)
- Landseer Scholarship First Prize (1967)
- David Murray Travelling Scholarship (1967)
- Cleveland International Drawing Biennale Third Prize (1981)
- Oppenheim–John Downes Memorial Trust Award (1984)
- SEA Major Award (2001)
- Lynn Painter-Stainers Prize (2012)
