= Grimsby School of Art =

Art school in Lincolnshire, England

Grimsby School of Art (est. in 1886) is a British art school in North East Lincolnshire, England. It is part of the Grimsby Institute since 2004.

== History ==
Grimsby School of Art's history can be traced back 1886, when an Art Class was established in the town. The students were awarded certificates the South Kensington Department of Science & Art, the forerunner of the Royal College of Art.

The building for the schoold, that got the name of Grimsby College of Art & Design, was designed in 1894 by Herbert Scaping.

The building is now derelict, the Art School becoming the East Coast College of Art and Design, part of the Grimsby Institute since 2004.

== Notable staff ==
- David Tarttelin,
- Harold Gosney,
- Albert Wade, Principal 1927-53
- Peter Todd was principal for 30 years and taught John Hurt

== Notable alumni ==
- Peter Brannon
- Richard P. Cook (born 1949)
- Robert Dukes (born 1965)
- John Hurt (1940 – 2017)
- George Rowlett (1941 – 2026)
- Nicholas Volley (1950 – 2006)
