= John Graham Wallace =

English author and illustrator

John Graham Wallace (born 23 August 1966) is an English author and illustrator of children's picture books.

== Early life ==
Wallace was born in Felixstowe and grew up in Market Rasen, Lincolnshire. He attended De Aston School in the town and went on to study Theology at St Catharine's College, Cambridge, graduating in 1988. Afterwards, he worked on the Daily Gleaner newspaper in Kingston, Jamaica, as a cartoonist.

== Published work ==
He has illustrated and written many children's books, many of which have been translated. His book The Twins was made into a television series on CITV in 2000. His work includes Mr. Bumble, The Jungle Kids, Wonders of America, Anything for You, Monster Toddler, and Pirate Boy.
