= Harold Gosney =

British artist and sculptor (born 1937)

- Born: 1937 (age 88–89); Sheffield, England
- Education: Humberston Foundation School, Clethorpes Grimsby School of Art
- Known for: Sculpture, Public Artworks

Harold Gosney is an artist and sculptor. Many of Gosney's commissioned works are in the public domain; notably at York Art Gallery and on permanent display in Ripon, York and Chester cathedrals.

== Career ==
Gosney, having been influenced by Tom Robinson, the art master at Clee Grammar School, became a student at Grimsby School of Art in 1954. He completed their Foundation course with such success that, two years later, he was offered a place at the prestigious Slade School of Fine Art. He won several prizes whilst studying at the Slade, eventually specialising in theatre design.

In 1960, Gosney returned to teach at the Grimsby School of Art. He became deeply interested in sculpture from this point onwards.

Gosney has worked in wood and copper with favourite themes being birds, horses and the female form. He developed a unique technique for working with sheet metal in three dimensions, exemplified by the life-size Horse and Rider, now permanently on display at Normanby Hall in North Lincolnshire.

The majority of Gosney's early commissions were collaborations with architects and he has made a significant contribution to public art in Grimsby. He is the artist responsible for the reliefs on the Abbey Walk car park, the large Grimsby seal by the entrance to the Grimsby Central Library and the Grim and Havelok themed copper relief on the side of Wilko store in Old Market Place.

Gosney retired from teaching in 1992 and moved to York to concentrate on sculpture.

As a rule, Gosney does not sell his work, but in 2017, to celebrate his 80th birthday and retrospective exhibition, he offered two lots for auction, with all proceeds being donated to the Stained Glass Trust in York.

== Themes ==
Gosney's work is often inspired by classical and Renaissance art and themes drawn from ancient and modern mythologies. The human form and the horse dominate his subject matter and can be seen in many of his intriguing and remarkable sculptures and the beautifully executed drawings which he makes when first planning commissions.

The artist has explained how his approach has changed over the years: "My first sculptures in the early 60's were in stone and were considerably inspired by the work of Henry Moore. When I experimented, first with cold cast metal and later with welding in steel and copper, I carried out a number of abstract pieces. However, I soon needed a different challenge and returned to work that was derived from observation and drawing, mostly inspired by human and animal forms. My work, whilst not overtly realistic, aims to consider the essence of the subject."

== Awards ==
- Gosney was awarded the Slade School of Art drawing prize as a student.
