= Troon Town Hall =

Municipal building in Troon, Scotland

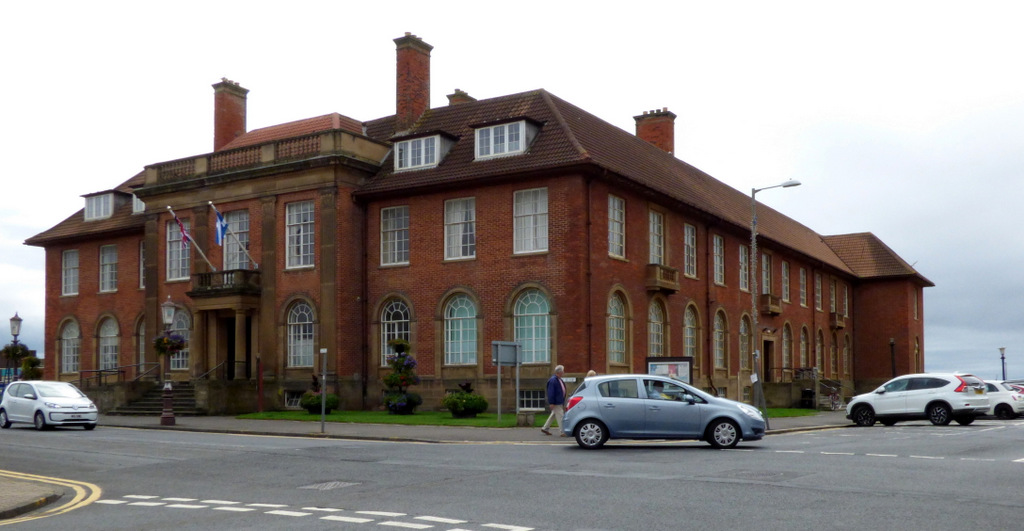
- Troon Town Hall

- Shown in South Ayrshire
- 55.5426°N 4.6626°W
- Location: Ayr Street, Troon

History
- Built: 1932

Site notes
- Architect: James Miller
- Architectural style: Neo-Georgian style

Listed Building – Category B
- Official name: South Beach, Town Hall including lamp standards
- Designated: 31 May 1984
- Reference no.: LB42136

Troon Town Hall is a municipal building in Ayr Street, Troon, Scotland. The structure, which serves as the meeting place of Troon Community Council, is a Category B listed building.

== History ==
Following significant population growth, largely associated with Troon's status as an emerging sea port, the area became a police burgh in 1896. The burgh commissioners decided to commission a town hall in the early 20th century but implementation was delayed by the First World War: the site selected on the sea front, which was occupied by several large residential properties, was donated, together with a sum of £2,000 towards the cost of construction, by the Duke of Portland.

The new building was designed by James Miller in the Neo-Georgian style, built in red brick with stone dressings and was officially opened by the Duke of Portland on 28 October 1932. The design involved a symmetrical main frontage with nine bays facing onto Ayr Street; the central section of three bays, which slightly projected forward, featured a flight of steps leading up to a porch with Doric order columns supporting an entablature and a balcony. There was a French door in the central bay on the first floor, round headed windows in the other bays on the ground floor and sash windows in the other bays on the first floor. The bays in the central section were flanked by full-height pilasters supporting an entablature, a dentilled cornice and a balustrade while the outer sections featured dormer windows at roof level. Above the front door, a stone panel was installed depicting The Duke, a steam locomotive designed and built by George Stephenson for the Kilmarnock and Troon Railway. Internally, the principal rooms were the double-height assembly hall and, at the rear, the concert hall, which was designed to seat 800 people.

In the 1940s, a site adjacent to the town hall which was occupied by another residential property, Ivy Cottage, was made available to the burgh council free of charge by the businessman, Sir Alexander Walker, who was chairman of the whisky business, John Walker & Sons. Ivy Cottage was demolished and a two-storey recreation hall was built on the site to a design by Richard Mervyn Noad and Alastair Frew Wallace and was opened as the "Walker Hall", in memory of Sir Alexander Walker, in 1975. The building continued to serve as the headquarters of the burgh council for much of the 20th century, but ceased to be the local seat of government when the enlarged Kyle and Carrick District Council was formed in 1975. The building was subsequently used for the delivery of local services by Kyle and Carrick District Council and, from 1996, by South Ayrshire Council, while the concert hall at the rear of the building continued to be used as an events venue. The town hall also became the meeting place of Troon Community Council.

== See also ==
- List of listed buildings in Troon, South Ayrshire
