= Alex Koolman =

English artist (1907–1998)

Alex Koolman RBA MSIA
- Born: Alexander C. Koolman; 1907
- Died: 1998 (aged 90–91)
- Known for: Painting; portraiture; teaching
- Elected: Society of Industrial Artists; Royal Society of British Artists (1948); Royal Society of Portrait Painters (1970)
- Website: Alex Koolman – Art UK

Alexander C. Koolman RBA MSIA (1907–1998) was an English portrait and figure painter who worked predominantly in oil and pastels.

Member of the Society of Industrial Artists.

Elected to the Royal Society of British Artists in 1948 and to the Royal Society of Portrait Painters in 1970.

== Selected exhibitions ==
Summer Exhibition, Royal Academy of Arts, London

Annual Exhibition, Royal Society of British Artists, London

Annual Exhibition, Royal Society of Portrait Painters, London

== Collections ==
- Kirklees Museums and Galleries, Kirklees, West Yorkshire
  - Lydia No. 2, oil on board.
