= Troon =

Coordinates: 55.54°N 4.66°W

Troon: Scottish Gaelic: An Truthail; Scots: Truin
- Town and sea port
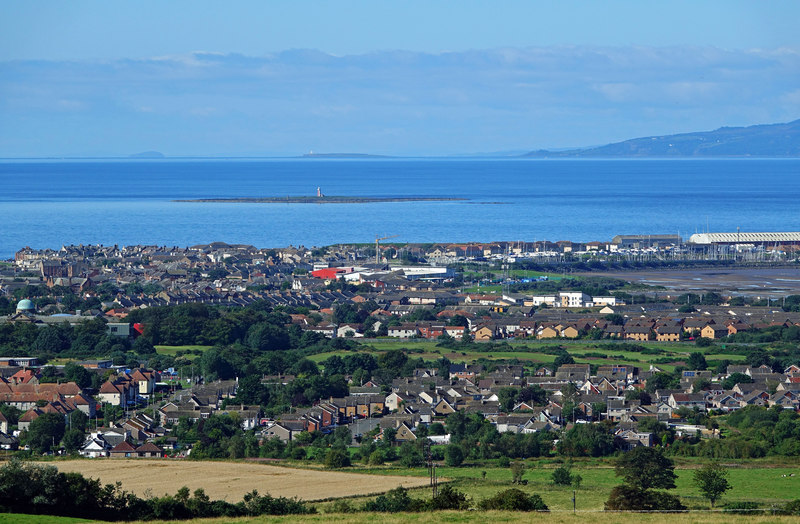
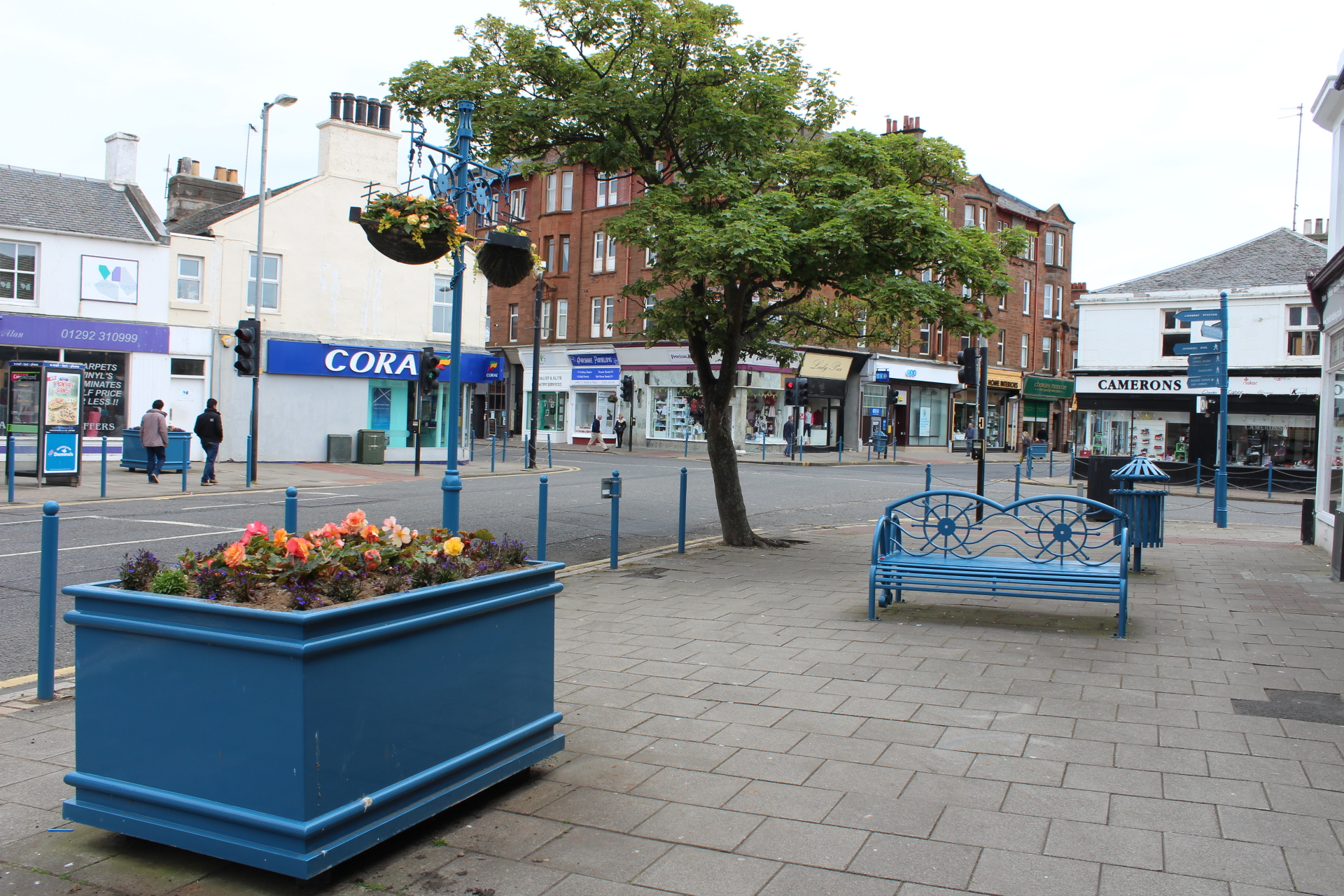
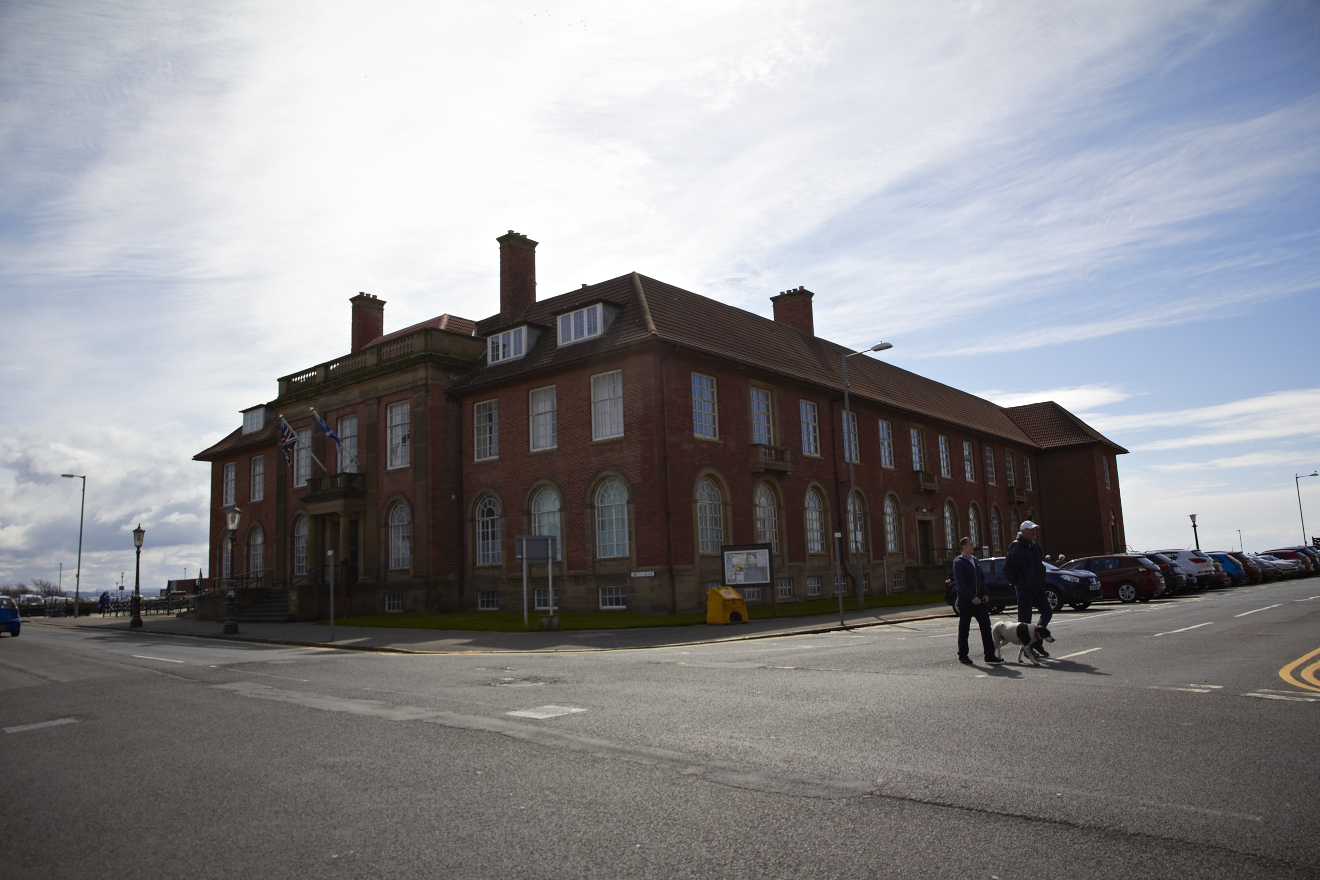
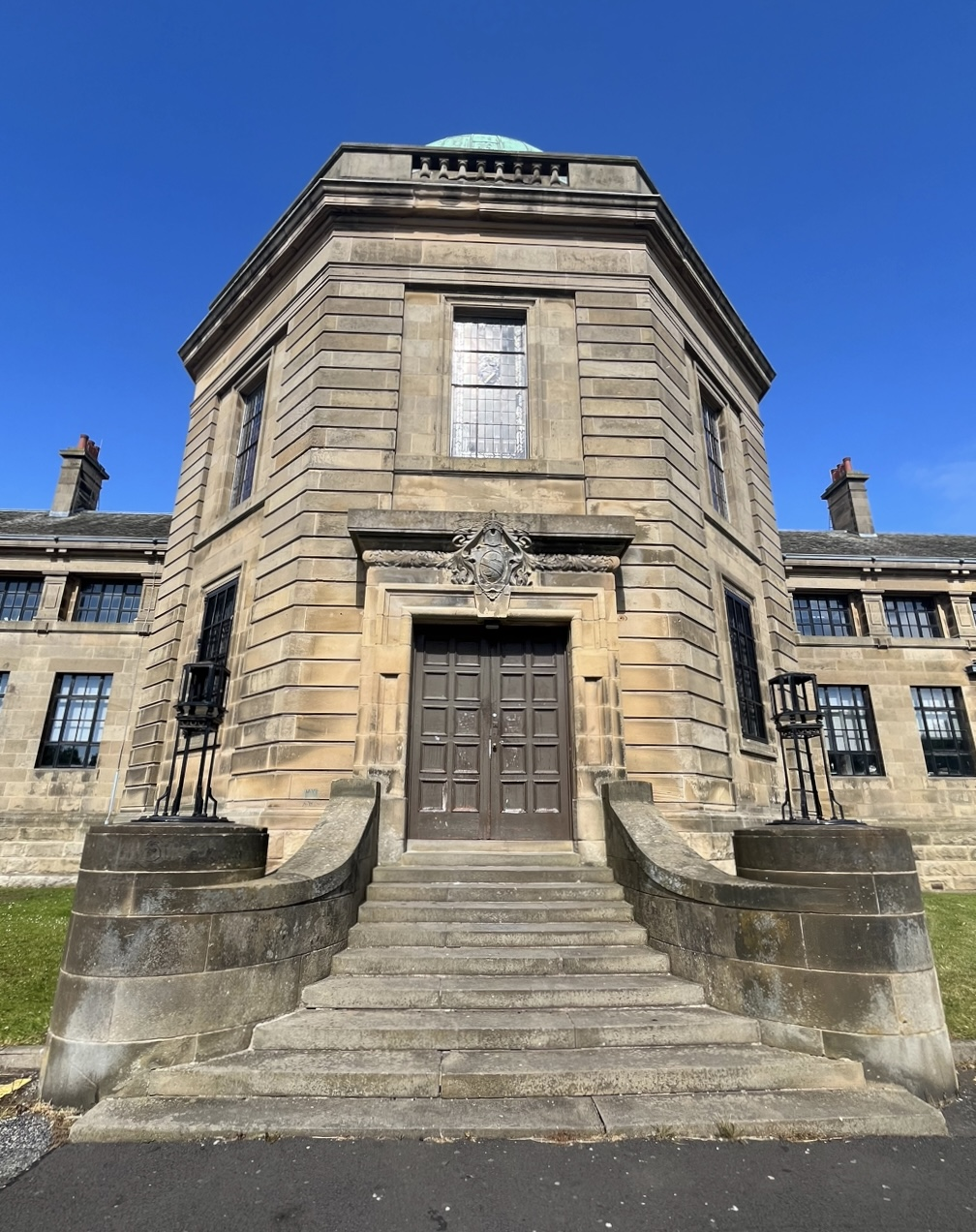
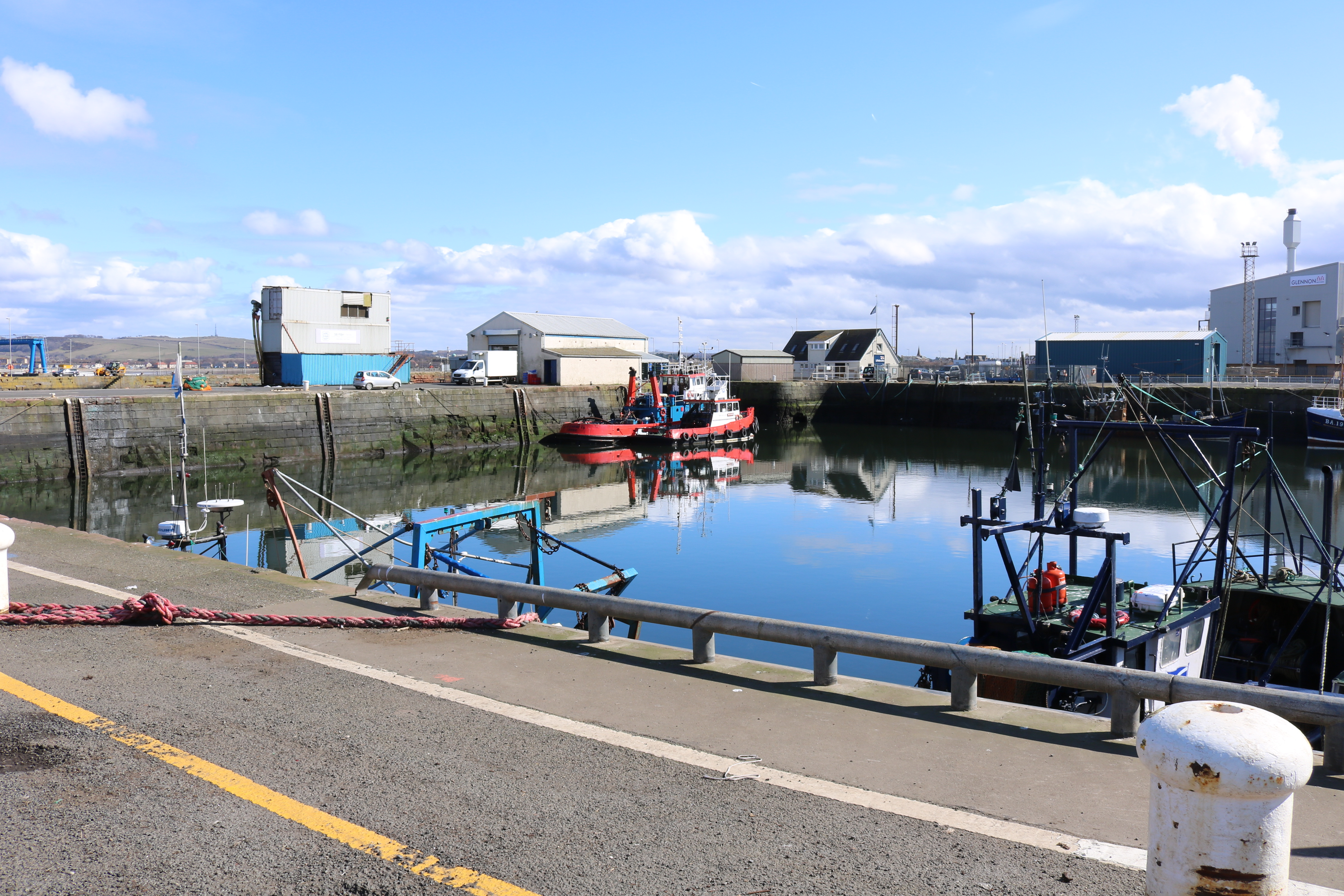
- Troon skyline Town Centre Troon Town Hall Marr College Troon Harbour

- Location within South Ayrshire
- Population: 15,261 (2022)
- OS grid reference: NS345255
- Community council: Troon
- Council area: South Ayrshire
- Lieutenancy area: Ayrshire and Arran
- Country: Scotland
- Sovereign state: United Kingdom
- Post town: Troon
- Postcode district: KA10
- Dialling code: 01292
- Police: Scotland
- Fire: Scottish
- Ambulance: Scottish
- UK Parliament: Central Ayrshire
- Scottish Parliament: Ayr

Troon (Scottish Gaelic: An Truthail) is a seaside town and sea port in South Ayrshire, situated on the west coast of Ayrshire in Scotland, about eight miles (thirteen kilometres) north of Ayr and three miles (five kilometres) northwest of Glasgow Prestwick Airport. Troon has a port with ferry and freight services, and a yacht marina. Up until January 2016, P&O operated a seasonal ferry service to Larne. In May 2006, a ferry service to Campbeltown was added, although this was withdrawn the following year. Since March 2024, Caledonian MacBrayne have operated a ferry service to Brodick on the Isle of Arran.

In 2022, the population of Troon, not including the nearby village of Loans but including the Barassie area, was recorded at 15,261, a increase from the 2011 population of 14,752. The estimate population in 2024 is just over 15,000.

== Name ==
The name Troon is likely from a Brythonic or Pictish name cognate with Welsh trwyn ("nose, cape"). When Scottish Gaelic became the main language, it is possible that the Gaelic form An t-Sròn (pronounced [ənˠ̪ ˈt̪ʰɾɔːn]; "the nose") was used for the name Troon. Since the words sròn and trwyn are cognate, it could have been easily adapted from one language to the other. This is similar to the Gaelic name of Stranraer (An t-Sròn Reamhar, the fat nose), which lies further south on the coast. However, it is not certain if An t-Sròn was the Gaelic name, as its usage cannot be traced back any further than Johnston's Place-names of Scotland (1932). It is more likely that a gaelicized respelling, such as An Trùn, was used.

The name An Truthail was used by Gaelic speakers on nearby Arran Island up until the 20th century.

== History ==
=== Early history ===
Troon Harbour Act 1808
- Act of Parliament
- Parliament of the United Kingdom
- Long title: An Act for the Improvement of the Harbour of Troon, situate on the West Coast of the County of Ayr.
- Citation: 48 Geo. 3. c. xlvii

Dates
- Royal assent: 27 May 1808

Text of statute as originally enacted

In 1808, the 3rd Duke of Portland added docks to the existing natural harbour on the north side of the headland, under powers granted by an act of Parliament, the Troon Harbour Act 1808 (48 Geo. 3. c. xlvii). The harbour opened in 1812 to serve the Kilmarnock and Troon Railway. Later improvements increased the protection afforded by the headland with an artificial "ballast bank" made from the dumped ballast of incoming merchant ships. Troon Lifeboat Station opened at the harbour in 1871 on land donated by the Duke of Portland.

Troon Harbour played a notable part in the development of the town for many years. It was home to the Ailsa Shipbuilding Company, which constructed many vessels for worldwide customers but mainly small passenger and various merchant vessels. The fishing fleet from Ayr moved to Troon Harbour and a revitalisation of the abandoned section of the harbour started. An approach road was constructed to connect to a P&O terminal which operates a service to Ireland. The Seacat high speed ferry service briefly operated from Troon Harbour. It is now a fishing port, yachting marina, seasonal passenger ferry port and Ro-Ro ferry terminal for timber and containers. Shipbuilding at Troon Harbour ended in 2000.

=== Economic growth ===
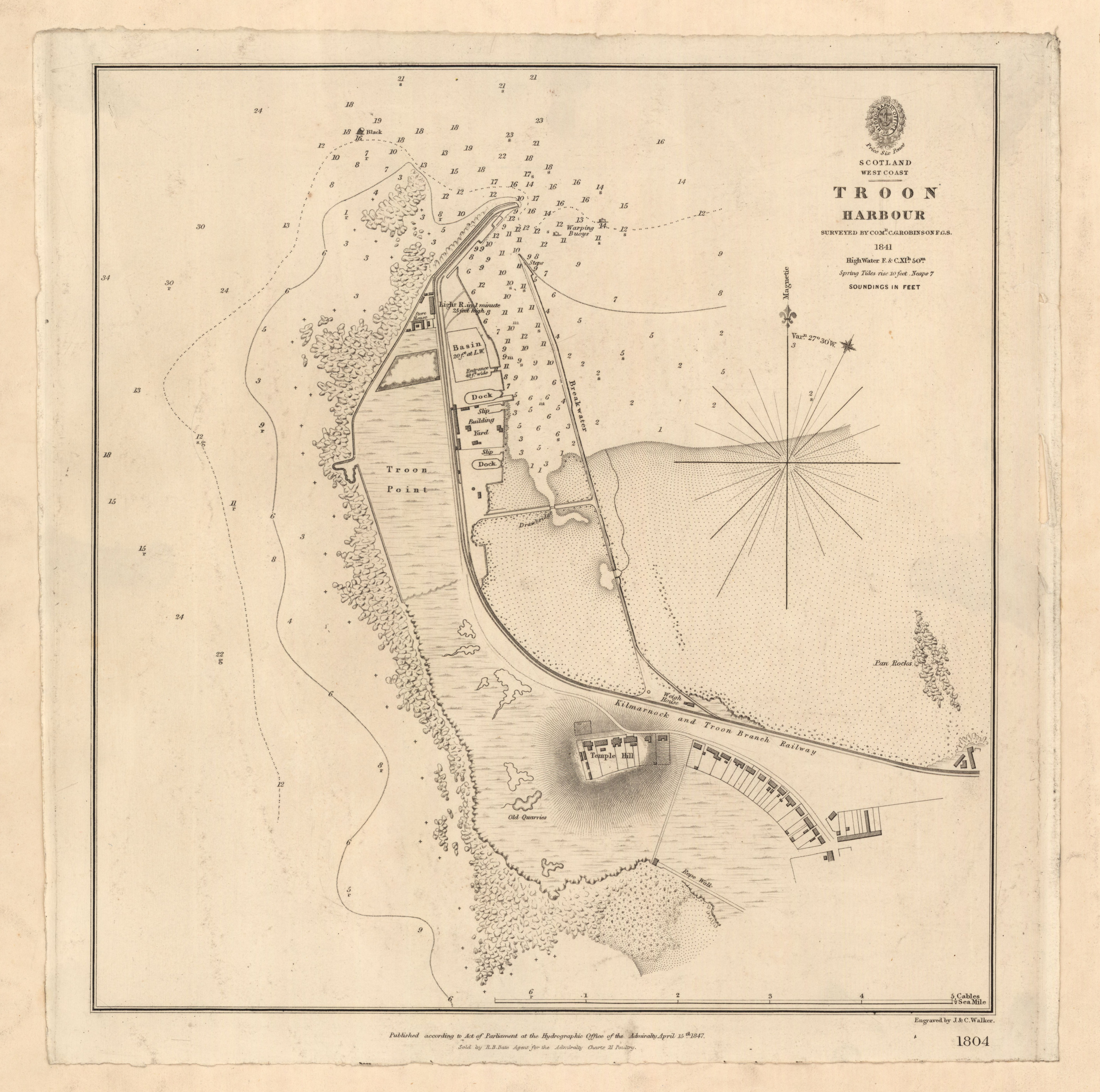
Nautical chart of Troon Harbour, 1847

From 1812 Troon was the terminus of the Kilmarnock and Troon Railway, a horse-drawn railway connecting it to the duke's coal mines around Kilmarnock. This was not licensed for passengers, a minor technicality evaded by weighing those wishing to travel and charging them freight rates. Troon (old) railway station was one of the first passenger stations in Scotland, formed in 1839 when the Kilmarnock and Troon Railway was upgraded to run steam locomotives as part of the Glasgow, Paisley, Kilmarnock and Ayr Railway. The town is now served by Troon railway station.

Troon is the birthplace of C. K. Marr, who left a fund to the people of Troon which was used to construct Marr College, the town's secondary school.

The artist's impression and the theoretical master plan for Troon that the Duke of Portland had drawn up was almost on as grand a scale, relative to its size, as that of Edinburgh's New Town. The broad streets with a grid network and ample space for civic amenities created for a thriving community built around the industry of the harbour. Troon's prosperity allowed this confident plan to be proposed. The drawing shows two spires, the taller spire was of that proposed by Troon Parish Church. Although the new building was erected in 1895 the spire was never completed. To the right a smaller spire indicates Portland Street United Free Church.

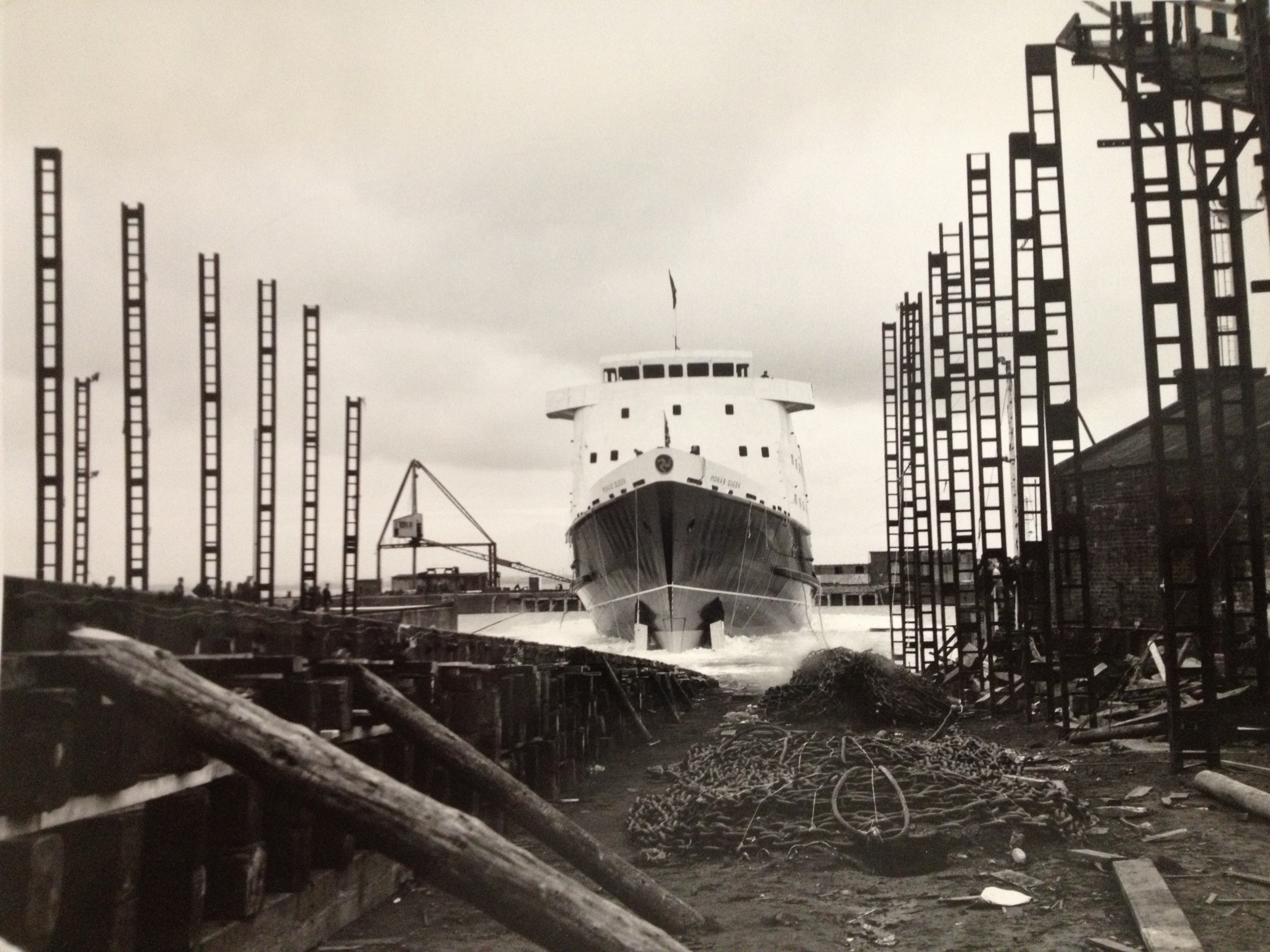
Launch of MV Mona's Queen at Ailsa Shipbuilding Company

The first railway in Scotland (Troon to Kilmarnock 1811) is clearly showing in the background. It was the Glasgow and South Western Railway in 1892 who altered this plan by building a loop to bring passengers closer to the beach and town. The park never came to pass but public spaces on the promenade, (where the bandstand was built), the ballast bank and Fullarton ground allow residents and visitors scope for leisure. The industrial units to the right of the harbour line towards Barassie were the gas works and slaughter house.

The Annual Reports of the Fishery Board for Scotland provide an insight into the state of fishing from Troon in the years before the First World War.

Fishery Statistics

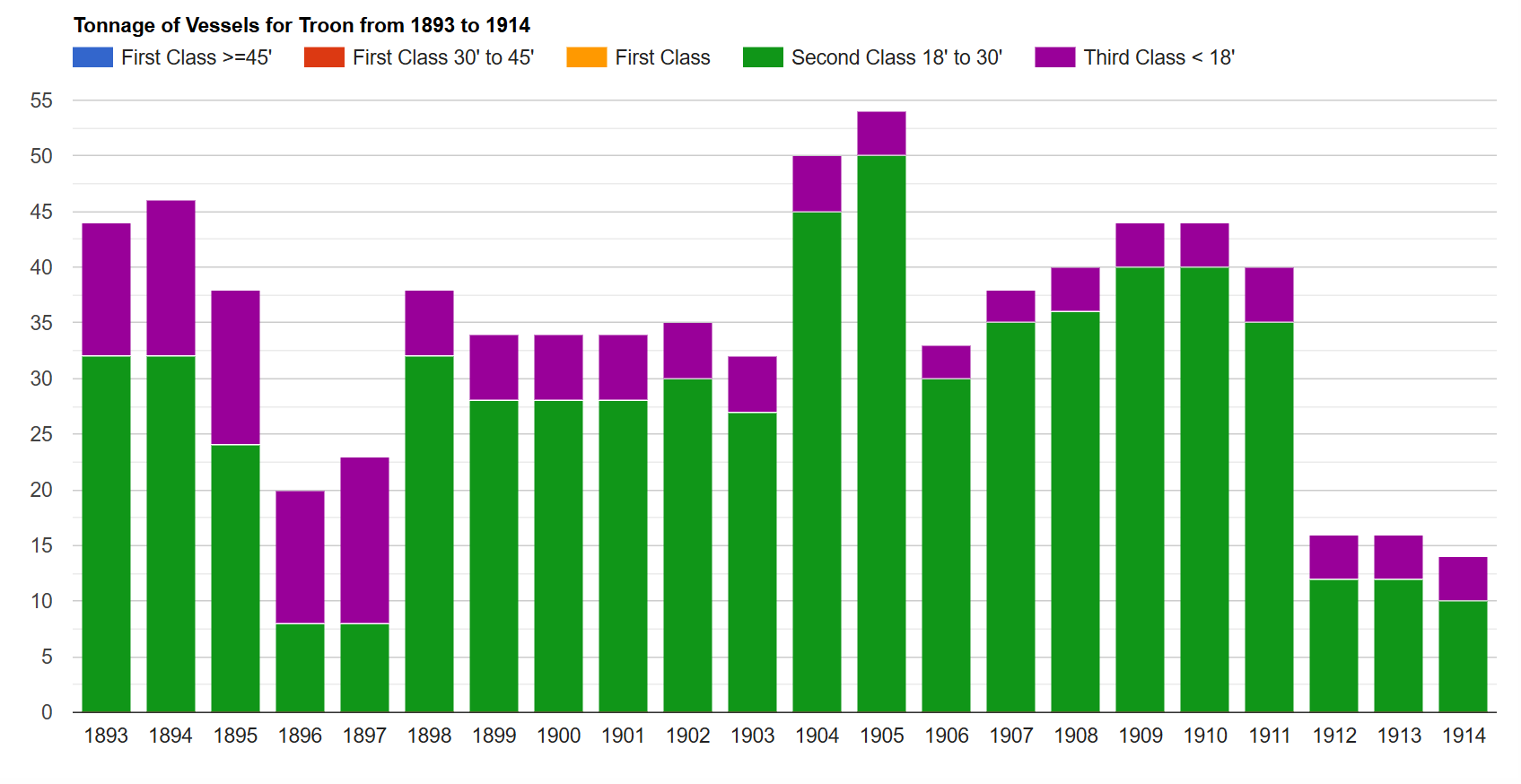
Tonnage of vessels

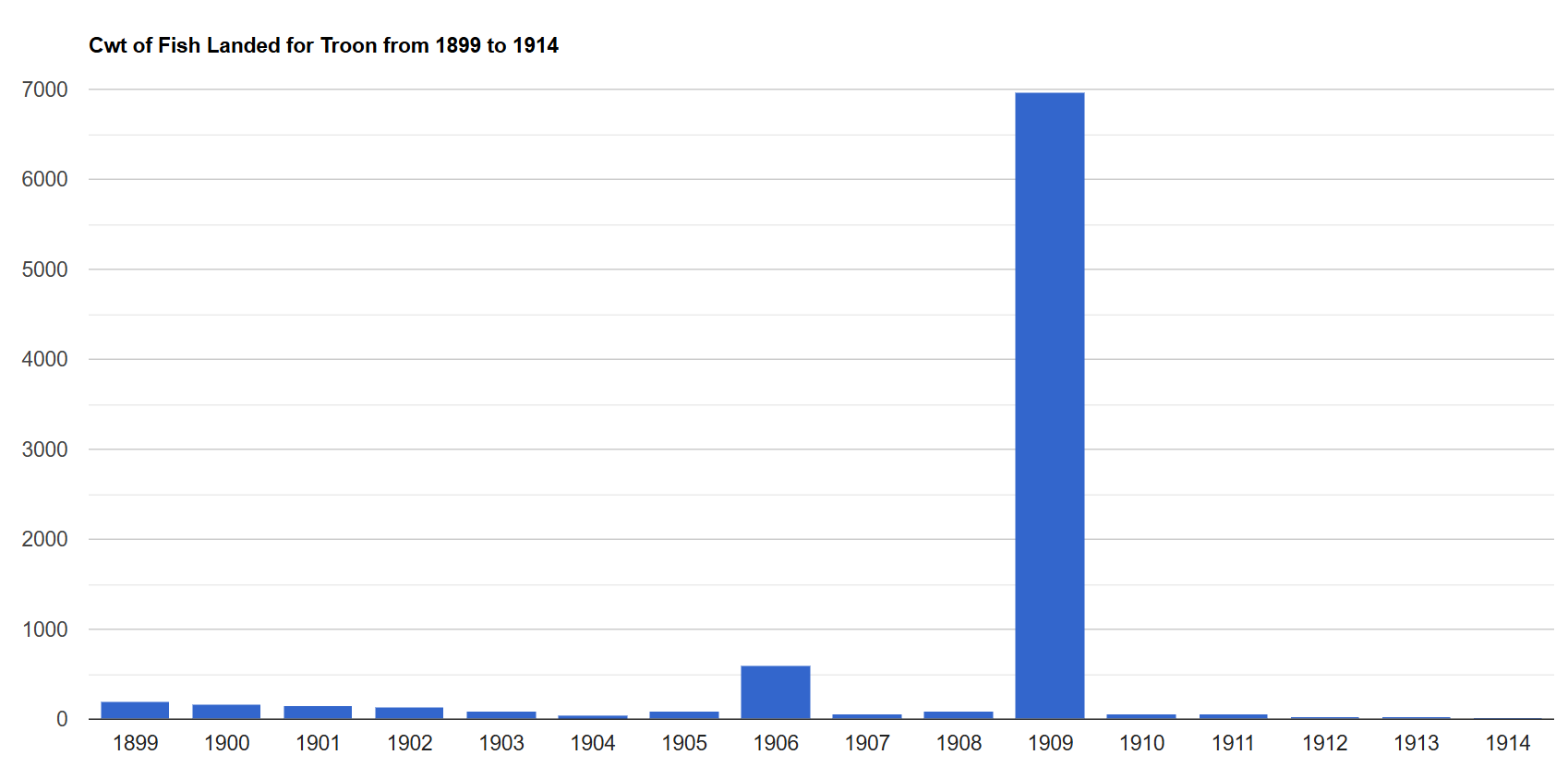
Cwt of fish landed

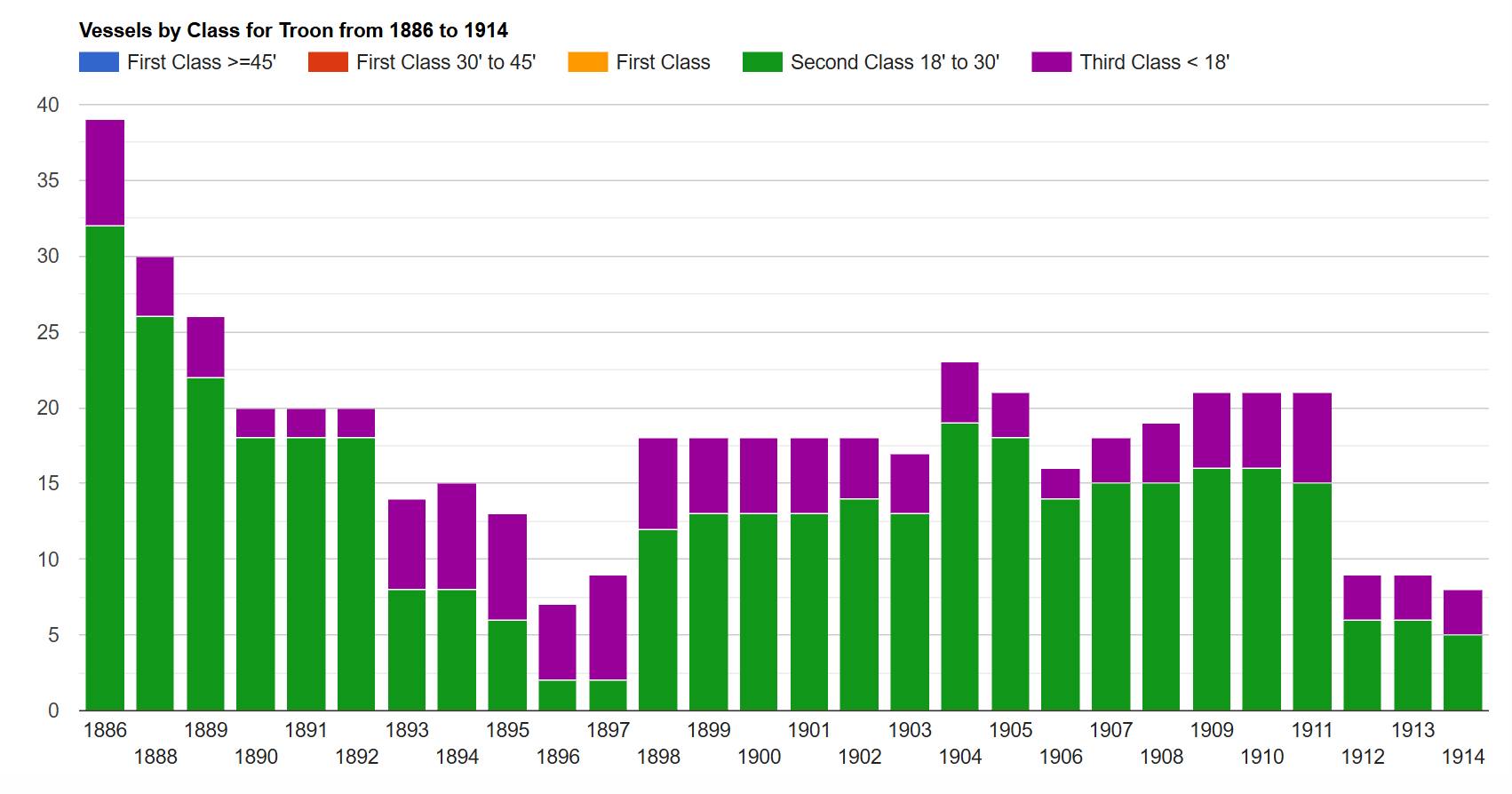
Vessels by class

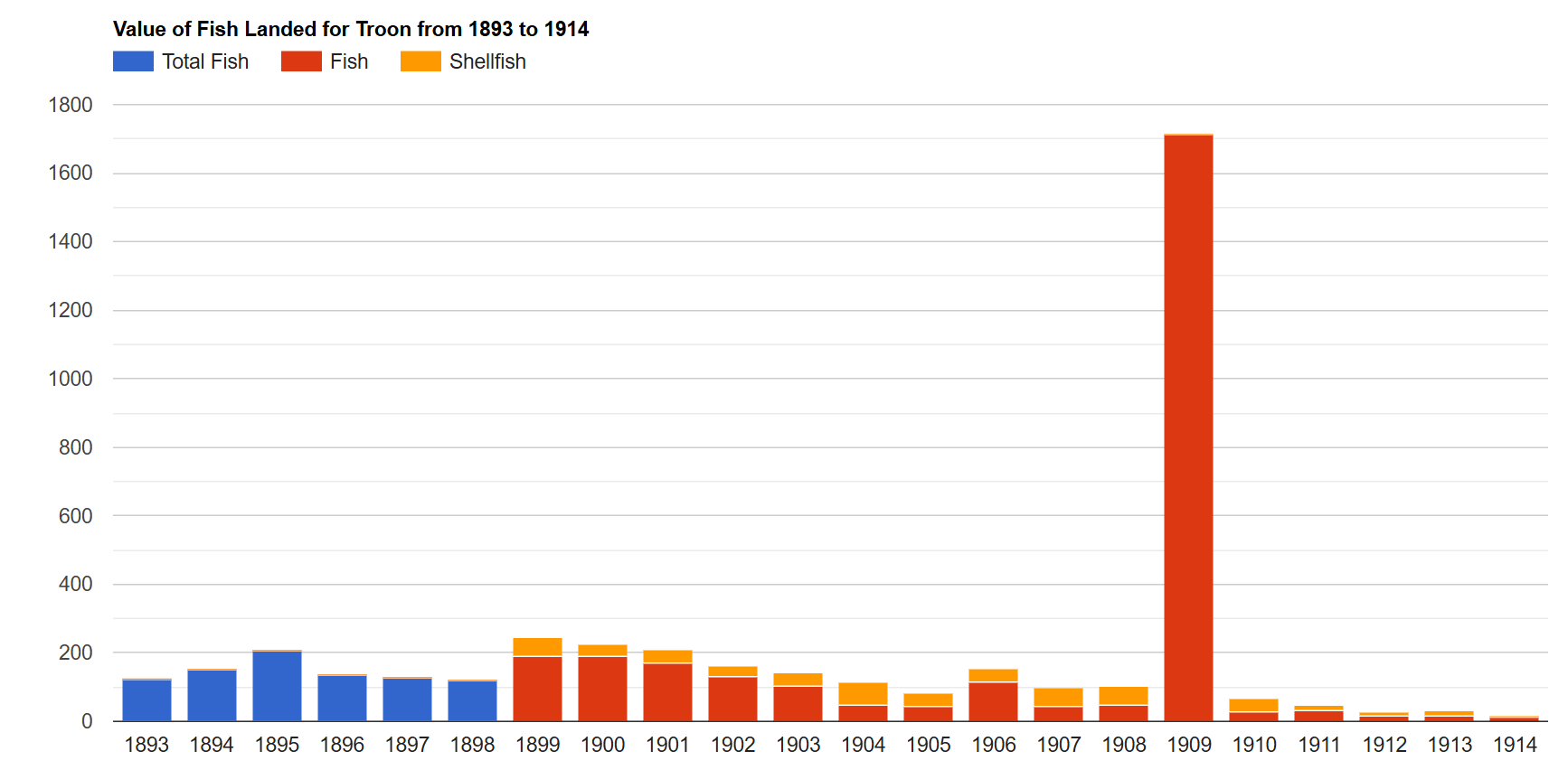
Value (£) of fish landed

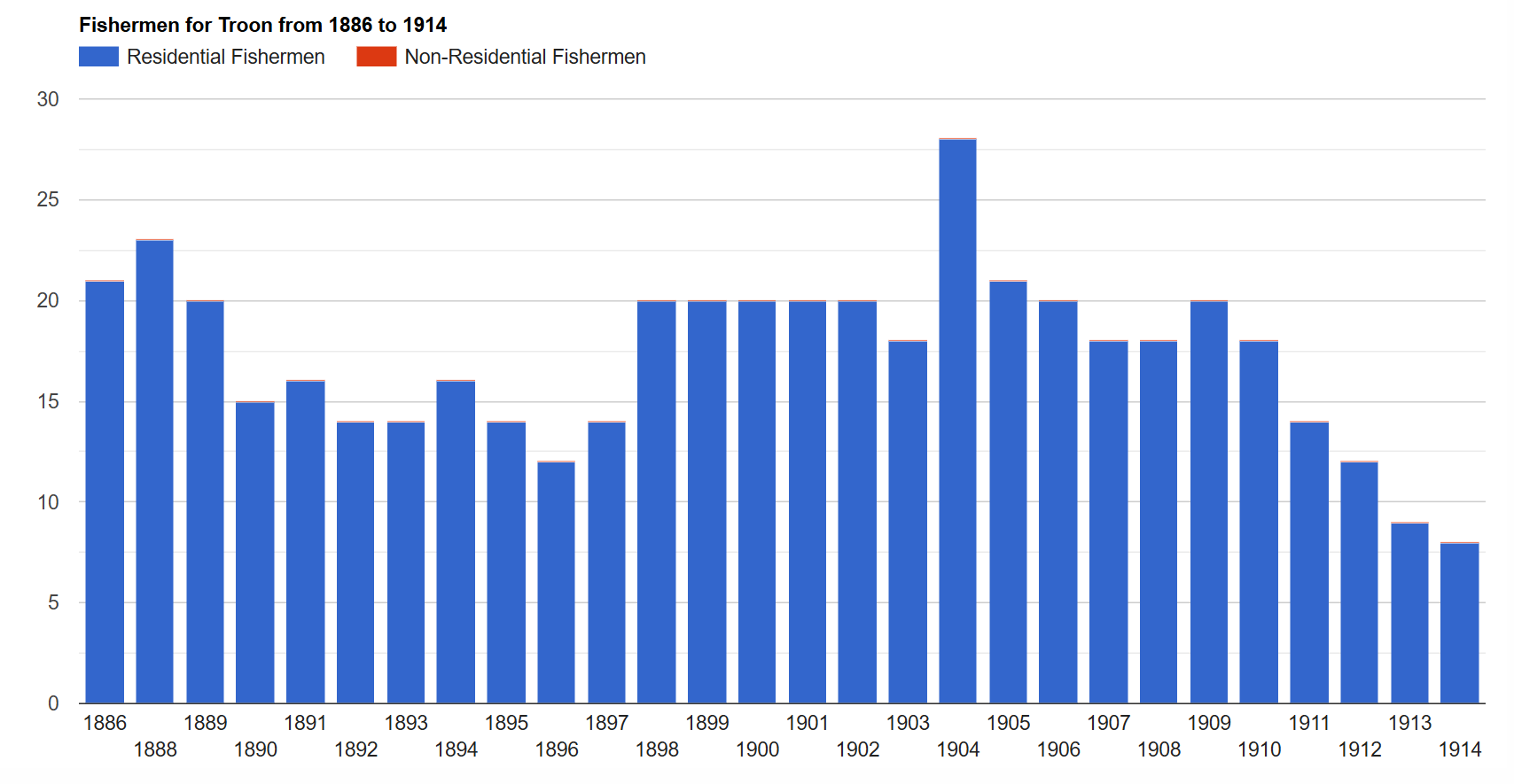
Fishermen

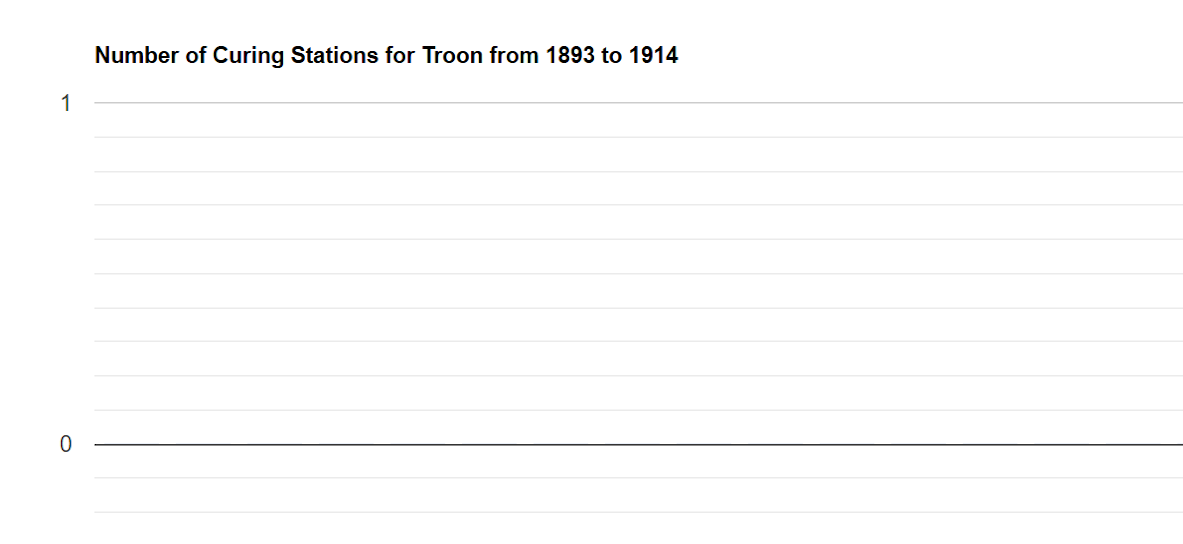
Placeholder - no curing stations

The very high result for 1909 is explained as follows: "fish nearly all landed by steam trawlers and sent to Glasgow market. Lobster fishing locally unsuccessful".

=== Fullarton House ===
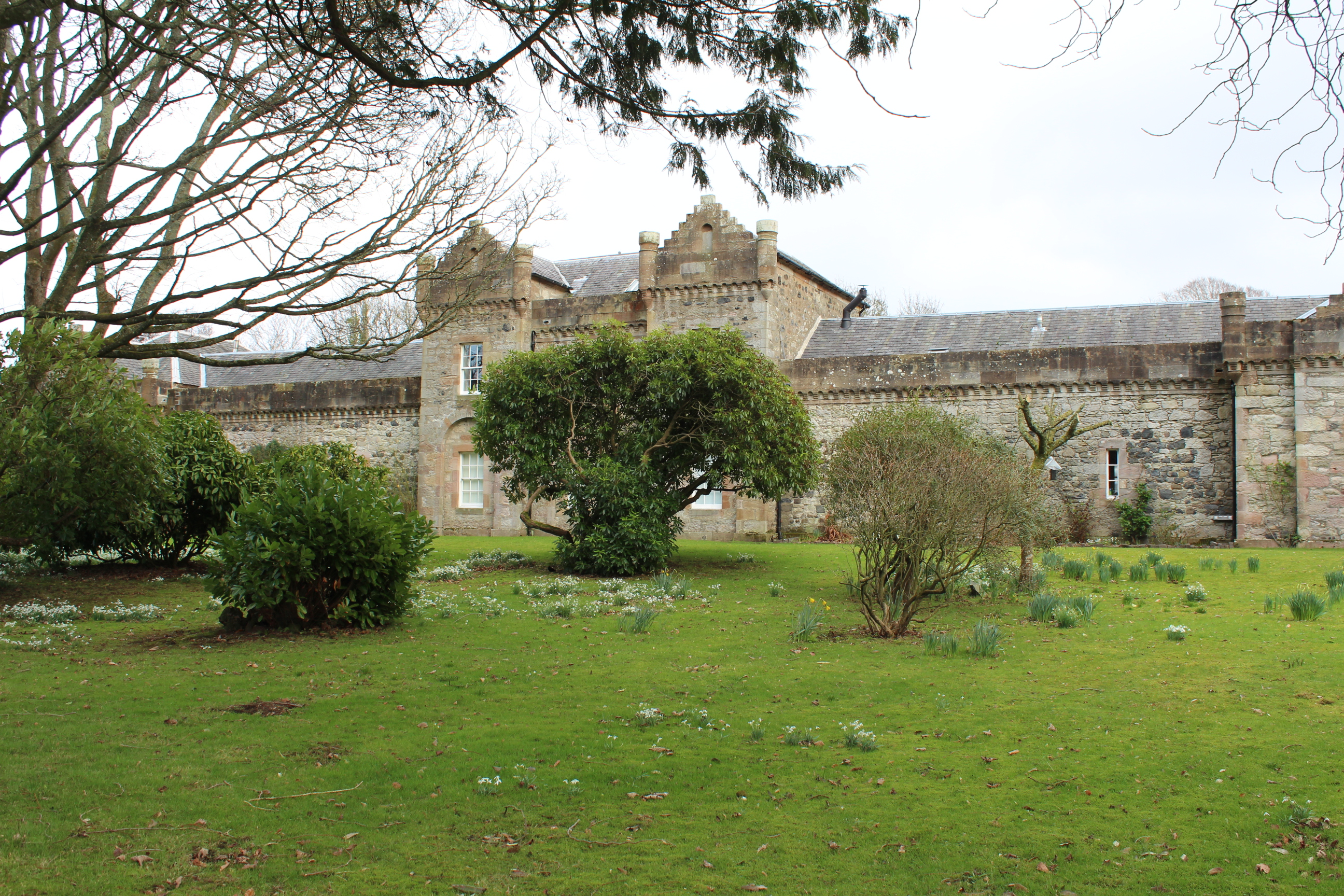
Fullarton House and surrounding estate

Fullarton House was built by William Fullarton of that ilk in 1745 and altered by his son, however it was demolished in 1966 by the council who had been unable to maintain the building after purchasing it in 1928. The entrance route had been changed by the Duke of Portland and the house design altered so that the back became the front, with grand views opened up of the Isle of Arran and Firth of Clyde. After centuries of occupation the Fullarton lines possession had thus come to an end when the 3rd Duke of Portland purchased the property in 1805. He lived here for a while as his principal residence in Scotland, however he had a greater interest in developing Troon harbour and the Kilmarnock and Troon Railway.

The grounds are now a park with some signs of the old house still apparent, such as the magnificent stable block, the ornamental pediments, walled gardens, doocot and an ice house. Reed Loch was located near Lochgreen House and was used latterly as a curling pond.

==== The Fullarton family ====
The name is thought to come from the office of 'Fowler to the King', the purpose of which was to supply wild-fowl to the King as required. The dwelling which came with the post was called Fowlertoun and the family may have eventually adopted the name. The Fullarton's of Angus had been required by Robert I to supply him with wild-fowl at his castle of Forfar.

Alanus de Fowlertoun was in possession of the lands shortly before his death in 1280 and the family continued in a nearly unbroken line from father to son. William Fullarton, the builder of the house, inherited the estate from his grandfather in 1710, he having inherited it from his brother in turn. Colonel Fullarton died in 1808, the last Fullarton of that Ilk laird. He wrote in 1793 the seminal A General View of the Agriculture in the County of Ayr and was one of the few on record to praise Robert Burns's skills as a farmer, commenting favourably on a method of dishorning cattle which the poet had demonstrated. Burns is said to have visited Fullarton.

=== Crosbie Castle ===
Robert II granted the old Crosbie estate to the Fullartons in 1344 and by the 18th century the old castle was partly demolished and converted into an ice house for Fullarton House, with a doocot nearby. In 1969 more of the ice house was demolished to make it safe. The building had been known as Crosby Place and later became Fullarton House, not long before the new building of the same name replaced it.

Over the centuries the castle was rebuilt three times, in the same typical square design as seen at Dundonald Castle. The remains today mainly represent the Castle's dungeon. Many of Crosbie Castle's stones were used in the construction of the first Fullarton House. The dungeon, had an underground stream, making it the ideal cold storage cellar or ice house.

=== Crosbie church and cemetery ===
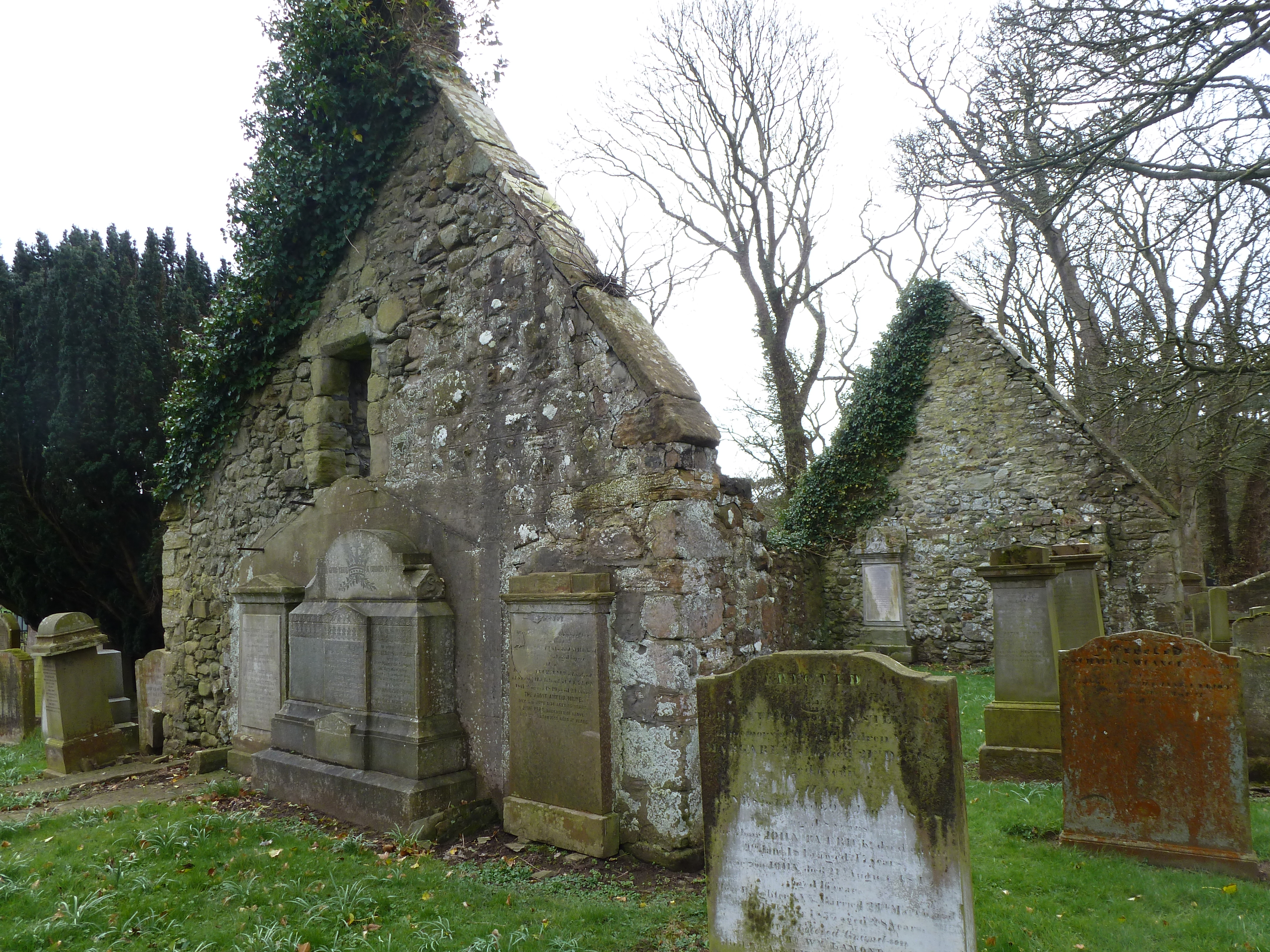
The remains of Crosbie Church in the town

First recorded in 1229, the present structure dates from 1691. Tradition claims that the roof blew off on the day in 1759 that Robert Burns was born and it was left to become a ruin. One of the graves is that off David Hamilton of Bothwellhaugh, son of James, alleged assassin of the Regent Moray, bastard son of James V. This event occurred in 1570 and David died in 1619. David Fullarton of that Ilk had married David's sister.

Constructed on the site of the original chapel, the name comes from the Anglo-Saxon word 'Crossbye', signifying the dwelling of the cross; a fairly common placename. The cemetery dates from circa 1240 and was held in secular times by Fullarton of Crosbie in the 14th century after being passed on from relatives. Records indicate that this ground was used by a holy order before the Fullartons arrived in the area. The chapelry of Crosbie, together with that of Richardstoun (Riccartoun) were attached to Dundonald and were granted by the second Walter Stewart to the short-lived Gilbertine Convent which he had founded at Dalmulin before 1228. The convent was dis-established in 1238 and the chapel passed to the monks of Paisley Abbey.

The cemetery was the burial ground for Troon until 1862 and family lairs were still in use until after the First World War. On the other side of the road, the remains of the church manse can still be seen (2009). The 'Wrack Road' was the Fullarton Estate estate road used by tenants who took their carts down to the shore to collect seaweed or wrack as fertilizer and it was the main road from Troon for funerals going to Crosbie.

== Politics and governance ==
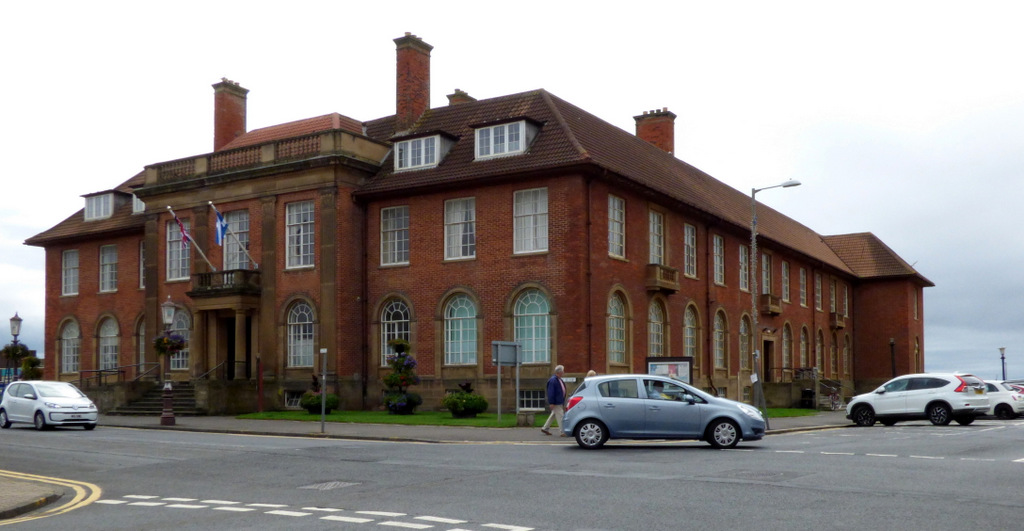
Troon Town Hall

Troon is part of the Ayr Scottish parliamentary constituency which has been represented by Scottish National Party (SNP) MSP Siobhian Brown since the 2021 Scottish Parliament election. The constituency also incorporates the towns of Ayr and Prestwick. At Westminster, Troon has formed part of the Central Ayrshire constituency since 2005. It is represented by Scottish Labour MP Alan Gemmell: the constituency extends south into Prestwick and rural South Ayrshire and north into Irvine and part of Kilwinning.

Councillors serving Troon
Four Councillors currently represent the Troon ward as part of South Ayrshire Council:

Councillors	Party
Kenneth Bell	Scottish Conservative Party
Bob Pollock	Scottish Conservative Party
Craig Mackay	Scottish National Party
Phil Saxton	Scottish Labour Party

Troon Town Hall, which is the meeting place of Troon Community Council, was completed in 1932.

On 18 September 2014 a referendum was held on Scottish independence from the United Kingdom. The South Ayrshire Council area voted against Scotland becoming an independent country at 58% No 42% Yes whilst Troon (which was counted with the rest of South Ayrshire) voted overwhelmingly against independence at 65% No 35% Yes.

== Economy ==
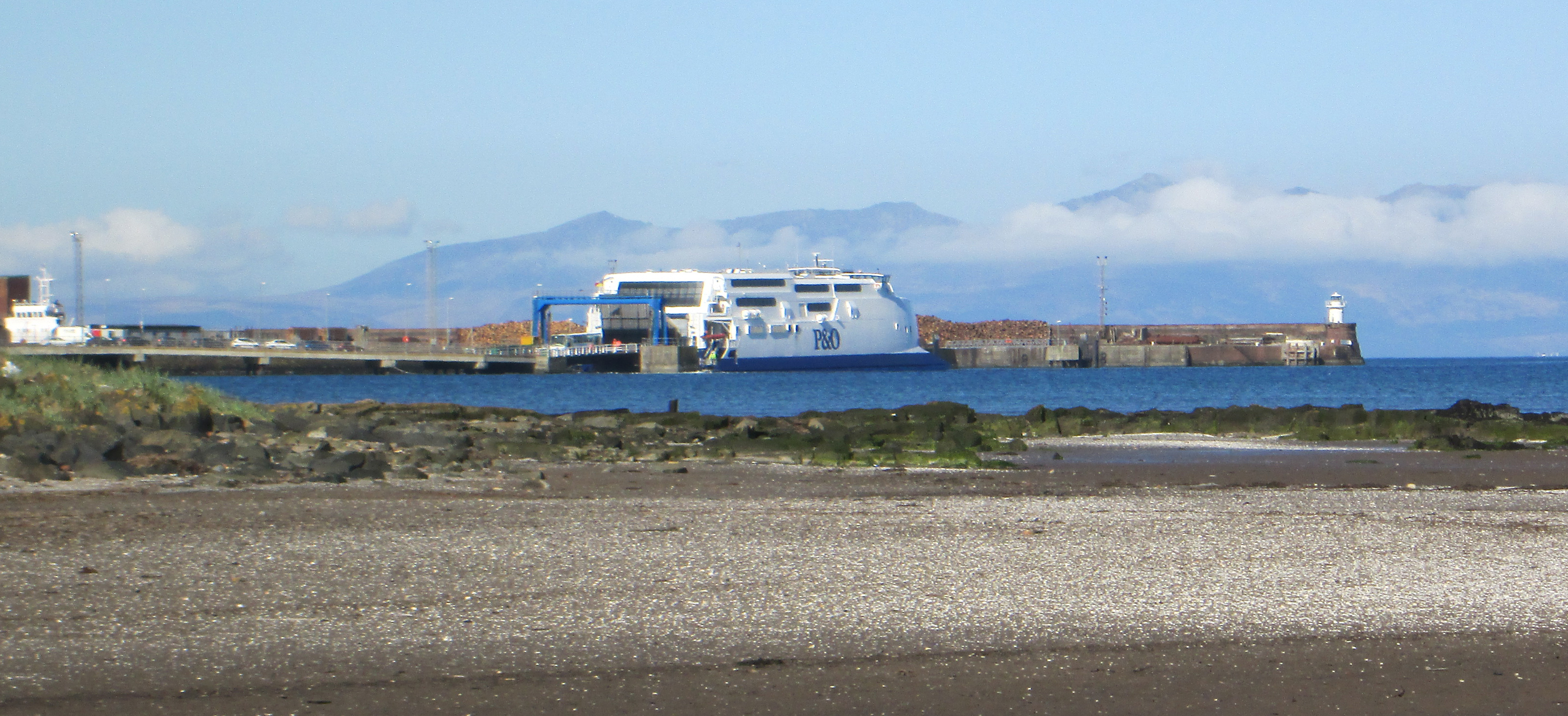
Troon harbour seen over the North Sands and Pan Rocks, with HSC Express at the P&O Ferries terminal, and log storage visible.

Troon is home to the Royal Troon golf course, one of the hosts of the Open Golf Championship. The course is chosen to host this annual event roughly every seven years. The last time Royal Troon hosted was for the 2024 Open Championship.

SeaCat opened passenger services from Troon in 1999, with catamaran ferries to Ireland. They were followed by P&O Irish Sea in 2003. SeaCat closed the following year. Up until 2015, P&O Ferries operated seasonal sailings with the high speed catamaran HSC Express: the term 'SeaCat' is often used to refer to the P&O service. P&O announced on 13 January 2016 that the Troon–Larne service was to close with immediate effect. The former SeaCat terminal is currently fenced off and is being used as log storage.

During a period of expansion and renovation work to the ferry terminal at Ardrossan in North Ayrshire, the ferry terminal at Troon has been used by ferry operator Caledonian MacBrayne for the Brodick sailings to the Isle of Arran. In March 2024, Caledonian MacBrayne confirmed plans to trial berthing the vessel MV Isle of Arran at Troon Harbour, and if successful, the vessel would commence further trials from sailing from Troon to Brodick.

== Education ==
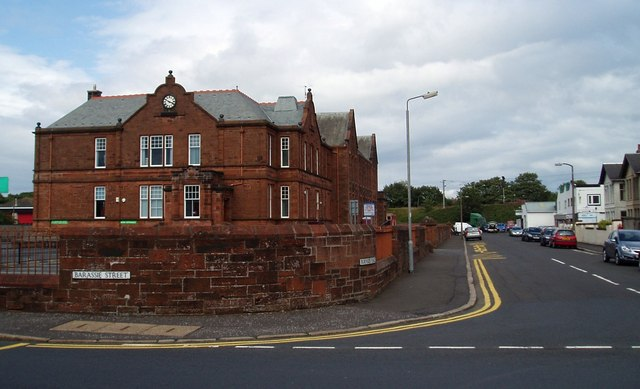
Troon Primary School, with adjacent Early Years Centre, located in Troon Town Centre

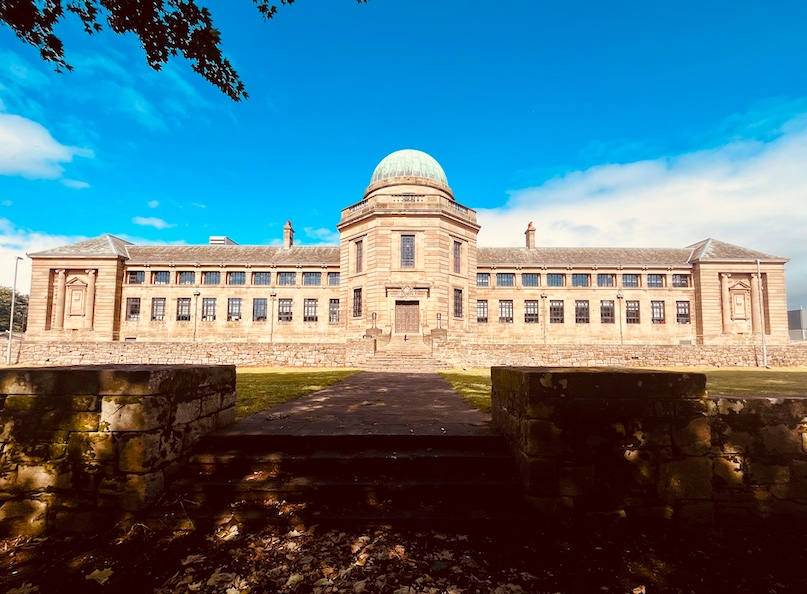
Marr College is the only secondary school serving the town and surrounding villages, such as Dundonald and Loans

Troon has five primary schools. Four (Troon Primary School, Muirhead Primary School, Struthers Primary School and Barassie Primary School) are non-denominational, and one primary school provides Catholic educational provision: St. Patrick's Primary School. Early years education is provided with a mix of private establishments and local authority establishments attached to primary schools which are operated by South Ayrshire Council. Troon is served by one secondary school, Marr College, which is operated by South Ayrshire Council. Pupils who access Catholic educational provision usually transfer to Queen Margaret Academy in nearby Ayr as Troon currently has no separate secondary school that accommodates this provision.

After school care provision in Troon is again a mix of private establishments and one local authority operated after school care club, which is based in and operated from Muirhead Care Club in the Muirhead area of the town.

=== Early years centres ===
==== Local authority ====
- Troon Early Years Centre
- Barassie Early Years Centre
- Muirhead Early Years Centre
- Struthers Early Years Centre

==== Partnership centres ====
- Granny Smiths Nursery
- Meadowgreen Pre-School
- Marina View Nursery

=== Primary schools ===
- Troon Primary School
- Barassie Primary School
- Muirhead Primary School
- Struthers Primary School
- St. Patrick's Primary School

=== Secondary schools ===
- Marr College

== Sport and culture ==
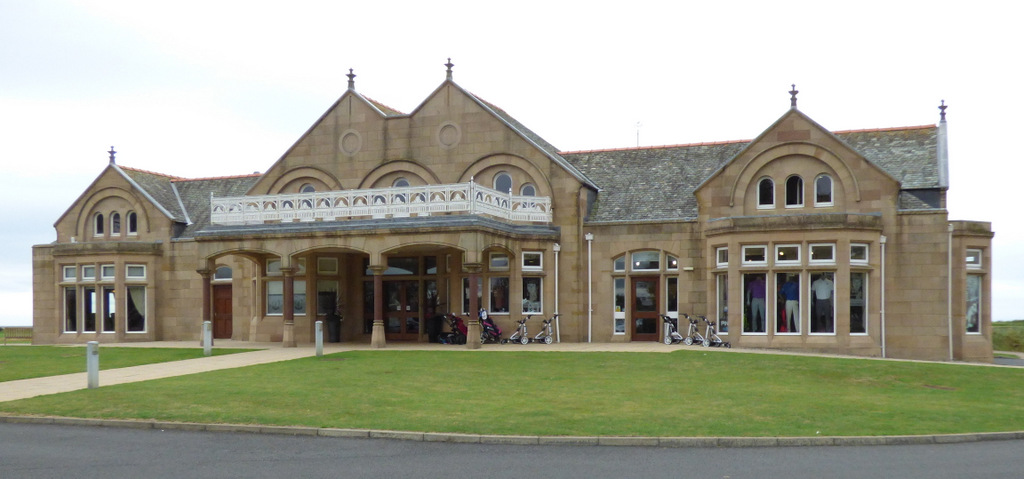
Royal Troon Golf Club

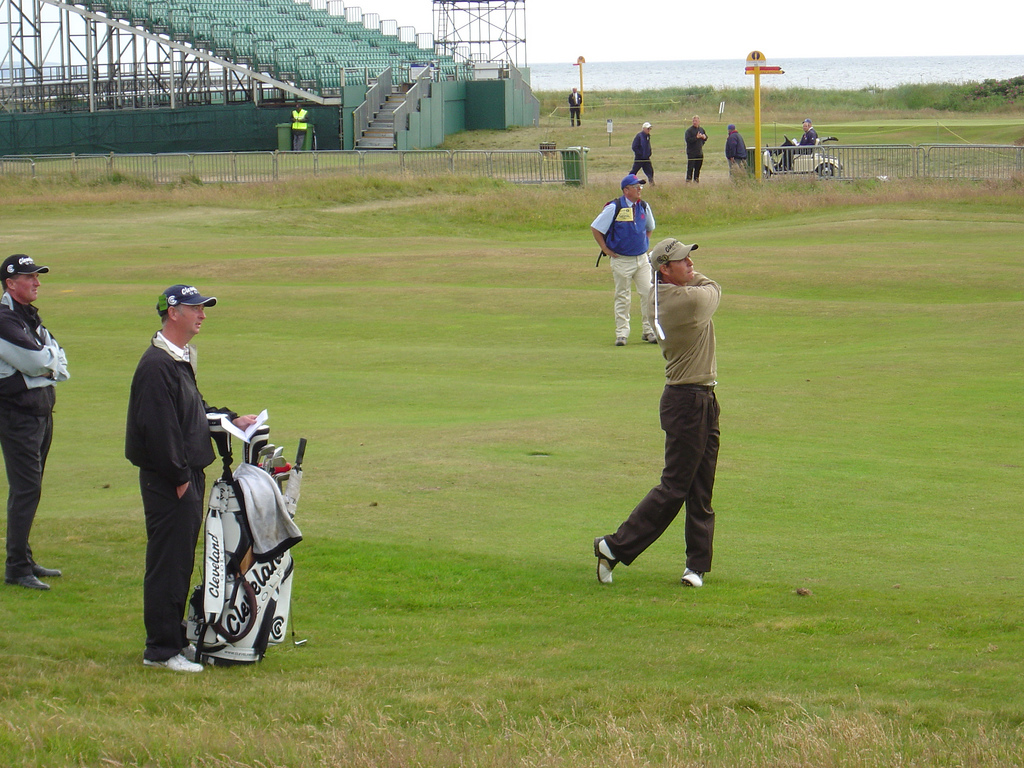
The 2004 Open Championship at Royal Troon

Troon is perhaps most famous for its golf courses, but there is also a healthy sporting culture in other disciplines such as windsurfing and kitesurfing. Troon Handball Club is a handball club that is located in Troon. The club was founded in 2008 when Ayrshire Handball Club disbanded into Ayr HC, Belmont HC, Grange HC (formerly Kilmarnock HC), Kyle Academy HC and Troon Handball Club. The club has two senior teams, a men's team and a woman's team. Both the men and woman's teams compete in the top tier of the Scottish Handball Association league system. The club also has a thriving junior section. The club also works closely with Marr College, the local secondary school, and has been crowned Scottish schools and junior Scottish Cup champions on several occasions.

Troon F.C. is the senior football side in the area, representing the town in the West of Scotland Football League, and play at Portland Park, close to the town's heart in Portland Street. The prominent sports team in the village is Troon Dundonald A.F.C. The club was formed in 1983 by 3 'ageing' players, at which time they were named Troon Burns A.F.C., and have now surpassed their 30th season in the Ayrshire Amateur Football Association. During this time they have had a few name changes, sometimes due to sponsorship commitments, but in 1998–99 season, they settled on Troon Amateurs Football Club.

In the years since their formation, they have enjoyed three promotions in back to back seasons, 1983–1984 through 1985–1986, which saw them go from the fourth division to the first of Ayrshire's Amateur Leagues, which is one of the largest and toughest amateur leagues in Scotland.

== Notable people ==
- Margaret Allan, racing driver
- Ronni Ancona, actress
- Tom Brighton, footballer
- Gordon Brown, rugby player
- George Brown, professional footballer and businessman
- Gordon Burns, footballer
- Robert Carrick, cricketer
- Fiona Caldicott (1941-2021), psychiatrist and psychotherapist, former Principal of Somerville College, Oxford, and Chair of the Caldicott Committee
- Neill Collins, footballer
- Andrew Cotter, BBC Sports broadcaster
- George Hunter, footballer
- Scott Manley, science communicator.
- Duncan Lunan, sci-fi writer
- Thomas O'Ware, footballer
- Rory McKenzie, footballer based at Kilmarnock Football Club.
- Dick McTaggart, boxer
- John Mason, co-founder, musical director, and conductor of the Scottish Fiddle Orchestra
- Colin Montgomerie, golfer
- Jamie Ness, footballer
- Steve Nicol, footballer
- D'Arcy Rae, rugby player
- George Rowlett, artist
- Bill Thomson, right winger for the Detroit Red Wings
- Brian Whittle, athlete
- Susannah York, actress
- Johnny Adair, Ulster Loyalist

== Twin towns and sister cities ==
Troon is twinned with Villeneuve-sur-Lot, Nouvelle-Aquitaine, France.

== See also ==
- Laigh Milton viaduct—the Kilmarnock and Troon railway or tramway
- WinterStorm - an annual classic rock music festival held in Troon Town Hall
