= De Aston School =

Location
- Willingham Road; Market Rasen, Lincolnshire, LN8 3RF; England; 53.3836°N 0.3255°W

Information
- Type: Academy
- Religious affiliation: Christian
- Established: 1863
- Department for Education URN: 136491 Tables
- Ofsted: Reports
- Head teacher: Simon Porter
- Gender: Mixed
- Age: 11 to 18
- Enrolment: 939
- Publication: De Aston Voice
- Website: www.deastonschool.co.uk

De Aston School is a mixed secondary school with academy status in Market Rasen, Lincolnshire, England. It also has a sixth form but no longer has a boarding house as of 2020, following the country's decision to leave the European Union, due to the declining popularity of boarding, and dwindling funds to support the facility. The school has a broad Christian ethos but accommodates those of other faiths.

== Admissions ==
The school has 939 pupils. The school used to provide boarding accommodation for around 80 pupils, many of whom came from abroad. De Aston was a specialist school in mathematics and computing.

== History ==
=== Grammar school ===
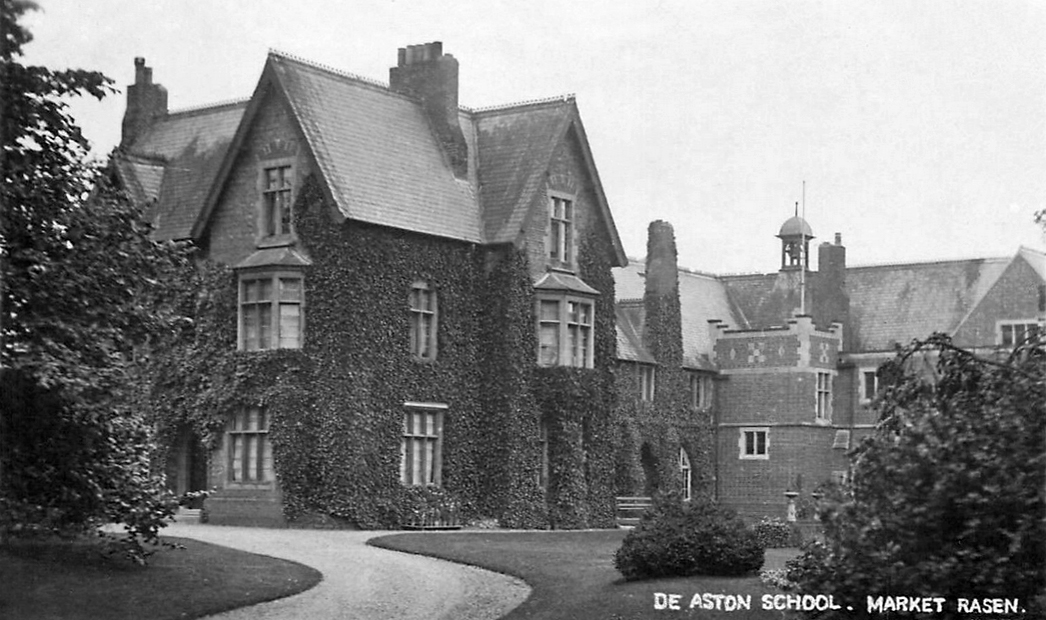
De Aston School pre 1915

De Aston School was founded in 1863 as a small grammar school, as part of a legal settlement following a court case involving funds from the medieval charity of Thomas De Aston, a 14th-century monk. Until 1995, the school's Foundation Governors also owned the chapel at the site of the charity's Almshouses at Spital-in-the-Street, 10 miles to the west.

The school's headmaster originally had his own house on the school site. The Victorian Gothic red brick house was built in 1863 and was designated as a Grade II listed building by English Heritage in 1984. The original buildings was designed by the Louth Architect James Fowler and further additions were added in 1904-6 by the Lincoln architect Herbert Dunn. As a grammar school it was administered by the Lindsey Education Committee, based in Lincoln, and became co-educational in 1971.

=== Comprehensive ===
It became a comprehensive in 1974 (when Lincoln became comprehensive), amalgamating with Market Rasen Secondary Modern School on Kilnwell Road. At the same time, new buildings were opened.

=== Academy ===
The school converted to academy status in March 2011.

=== Headteachers ===
Simon Porter

== Media ==
In March 2001, at the Secondary Heads Association's conference in Newport, Ellenor Beighton, head teacher, spoke out against the current funding system for schools. Then in July 2001 Former Headmaster Anthony Neal disagreed with School Standards Minister Stephen Timms over the benefits of specialist schools saying that they create a two-tier system. Homework was being publicly discussed in December 2001 in the wake of Cherie Blair's request to the Ministry of Defence for information to help with her son's homework. Neal commented that homework was essential and central to the fact that standards were rising.

Police apologised to the school, in November 2006, after a computer error wrongly put it at the top of a national table for the number of police call-outs.

== Notable former pupils ==
- Phil Boulton, Professional Rugby Union player with Leicester Tigers, Rotherham Titans and Bedford Blues.
- Bruce Barrymore Halpenny, military historian and author
- Harriet Bibby, actress
- Sir Walter Liddall CBE, Conservative MP from 1931 to 1945 for Lincoln
- Philippa Lowthorpe, television director whose credits include the controversial Jamaica Inn, and Call the Midwife
- Robbie Moore, Conservative MP since 2019 for Keighley and Ilkley
- George Rowlett, artist
- Luke Taylor, Lib Dem MP since 2024 for Sutton and Cheam; his mother, Julie, was a History teacher, and head of the sixth form
- Rod Temperton, songwriter of the Michael Jackson song Thriller
- John Graham Wallace, illustrator
- Edward Welbourne, economic historian and Master of Emmanuel College, Cambridge, from 1951 to 1964.
- Prof Charles Wilson CBE, Professor of Modern History from 1965 to 1979 at the University of Cambridge
- Gordon White, Baron White of Hull, co-founder of Hanson plc

=== Market Rasen Secondary Modern School ===
- Bernie Taupin, lyricist for Elton John
