= Crosshill railway station (Ayrshire) =

Short-lived railway station in Crosshill, South Ayrshire

Crosshill

General information
- Location: Crosshill, South Ayrshire; Scotland
- Coordinates: 55.32975°N 4.66734°W

Other information
- Status: Disused

History
- Original company: Glasgow and South Western Railway
- Pre-grouping: Glasgow and South Western Railway

Key dates
- 24 May 1860: Opened
- March 1862: Closed
Location

Crosshill railway station served the village of Crosshill, South Ayrshire, Scotland, from 1860 to 1862 on the Maybole and Girvan Railway.

== History ==
The station was opened on 24 May 1860 by the Glasgow and South Western Railway. From August 1861, trains were reduced to Tuesdays only. It was a short-lived station, only being open for less than two years, closing on 1 March 1862.

| Preceding station | Historical railways | Following station |
|---|---|---|
| Maybole; Line open, station open | Glasgow and South Western Railway; Maybole and Girvan Railway | Kilkerran; Line open, station closed |
