= Killochan railway station =

Former railway station in Scotland

Killochan
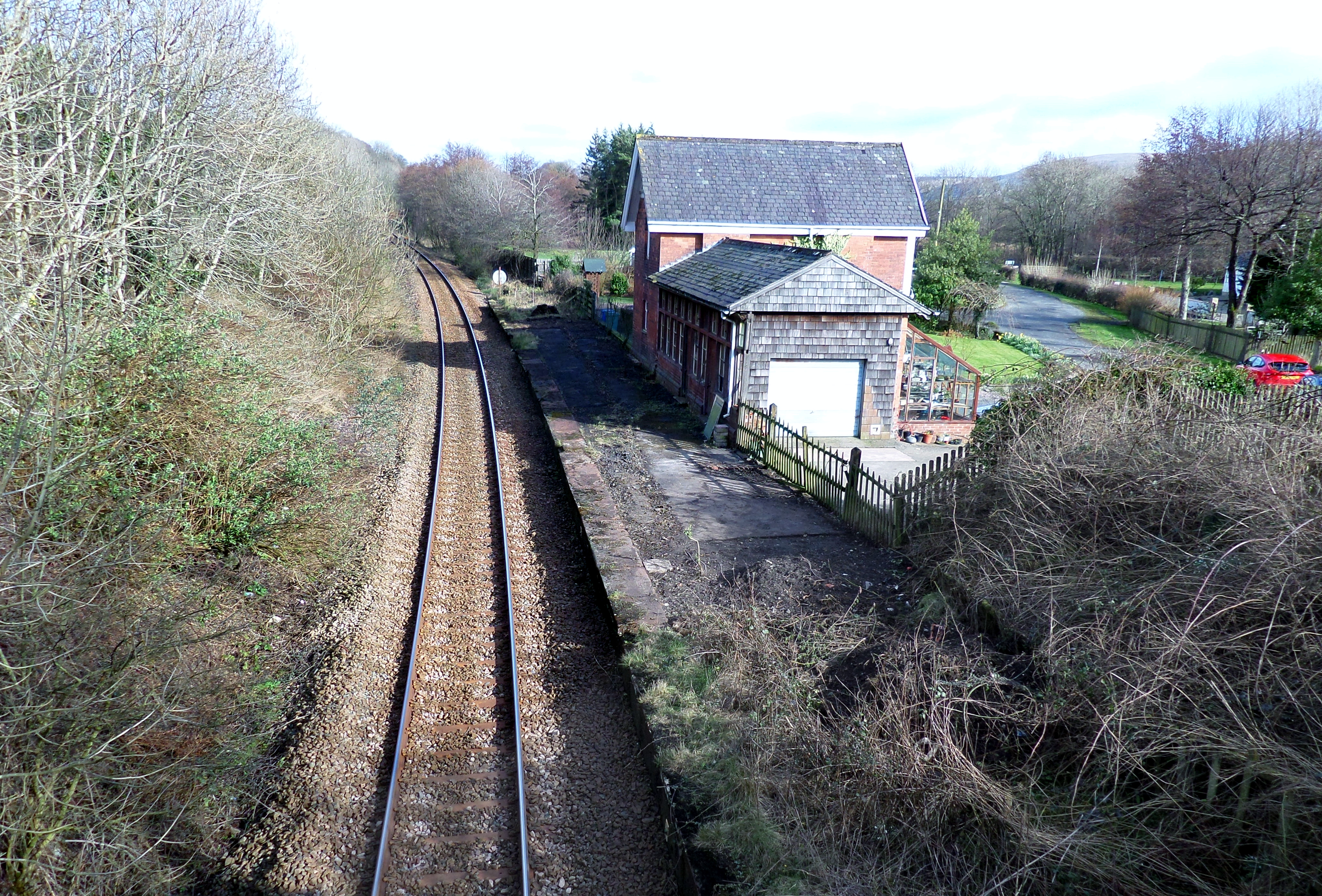
- Killochan Station looking towards Ayr

General information
- Location: Between Dailly and Girvan; Scotland
- Coordinates: 55.267314°N 4.800088°W
- Grid reference: NS 22193 00592
- Platforms: 2

History
- Original company: Maybole and Girvan Railway
- Pre-grouping: Glasgow and South Western Railway
- Post-grouping: London, Midland and Scottish Railway

Key dates
- 24 May 1860: Opened
- 1 January 1951: Closed
Location

Killochan railway station was located in a rural part of South Ayrshire, Scotland and mainly served the nearby Killochan Castle estate. The Killochan bank is the name given to this section of the line, running from Girvan on an uphill gradient to just north of the old station site. Maybole is around nine miles away and Girvan two miles.

== History ==
Opened to serve the Killochan Castle estate and surrounding population in 1860 by the Maybole and Girvan Railway it closed in 1951. before the era of the Beeching cuts.

Killochan Colliery (aka Bargany Pit), Craigie No. 1 Section, Parish of Dailly was still working up until the 1970s and had a coal washing plant that was used to treat coal from the other pits in the valley. A station solely for the use of miners was located at Bargany, known as Bargany Colliery Platform, opened at an unrecorded date and closed in July 1926.

Grangeston Halt railway station was located nearby as a private facility used by staff from the ICI munitions plant at Grangeston during WWII and closed in 1965.

=== Station infrastructure ===
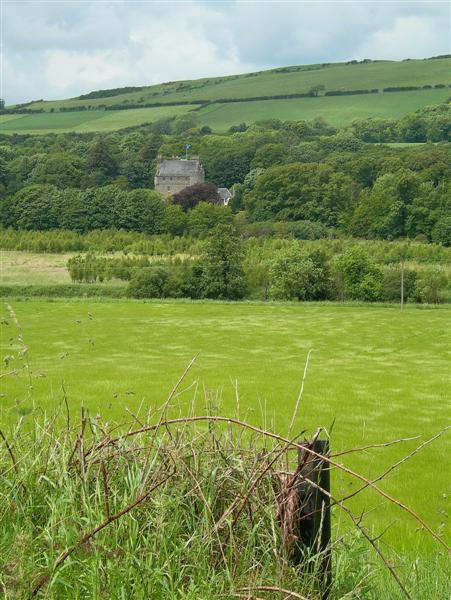
Killochan Castle.

It was originally on a single track section that was later doubled and had two platforms with a signal box, goods yards with a loading dock and a goods shed. The dwelling house was a two-storeyed English Arts and Crafts structure with a very attractive single-storeyed glass conservatory-like waiting rooms section. Like Cassillis railway station that also served a castle and country estate, the main building was rebuilt circa 1900.

A quarry once lay nearby and a narrow gauge railway crossed the line bringing stone into the Killochan goods yard for loading into standard gauge goods trucks. In 1965 the signal box was still present as was the second platform and the old toilet block. A 1970 photograph shows the station substantially intact despite closure in 1951 although only a single platform remains. By 2011 the station buildings had been much altered with the signal box gone, toilet block demolished, waiting room converted into a garage and the substantial chimneys removed from the two storey station house.

== Micro-history ==
Killochan Castle is one of the finest fortified houses in the South of Scotland and was held by the Cathcart family from around 1586 until 1954. In Victorian times it was a busy and populated estate and provided significant freight and passenger traffic for this rural station.

Preceding station	National Rail	Following station
Dailly	ScotRail; Glasgow South Western Line	Girvan
	Historical railways	
Dailly; Line open; station closed	Glasgow and South Western Railway; Maybole and Girvan Railway	Girvan; Line open; station open
