= Girvan railway station =

Railway station in South Ayrshire, Scotland

Girvan Scottish Gaelic: Inbhir Gharbhain
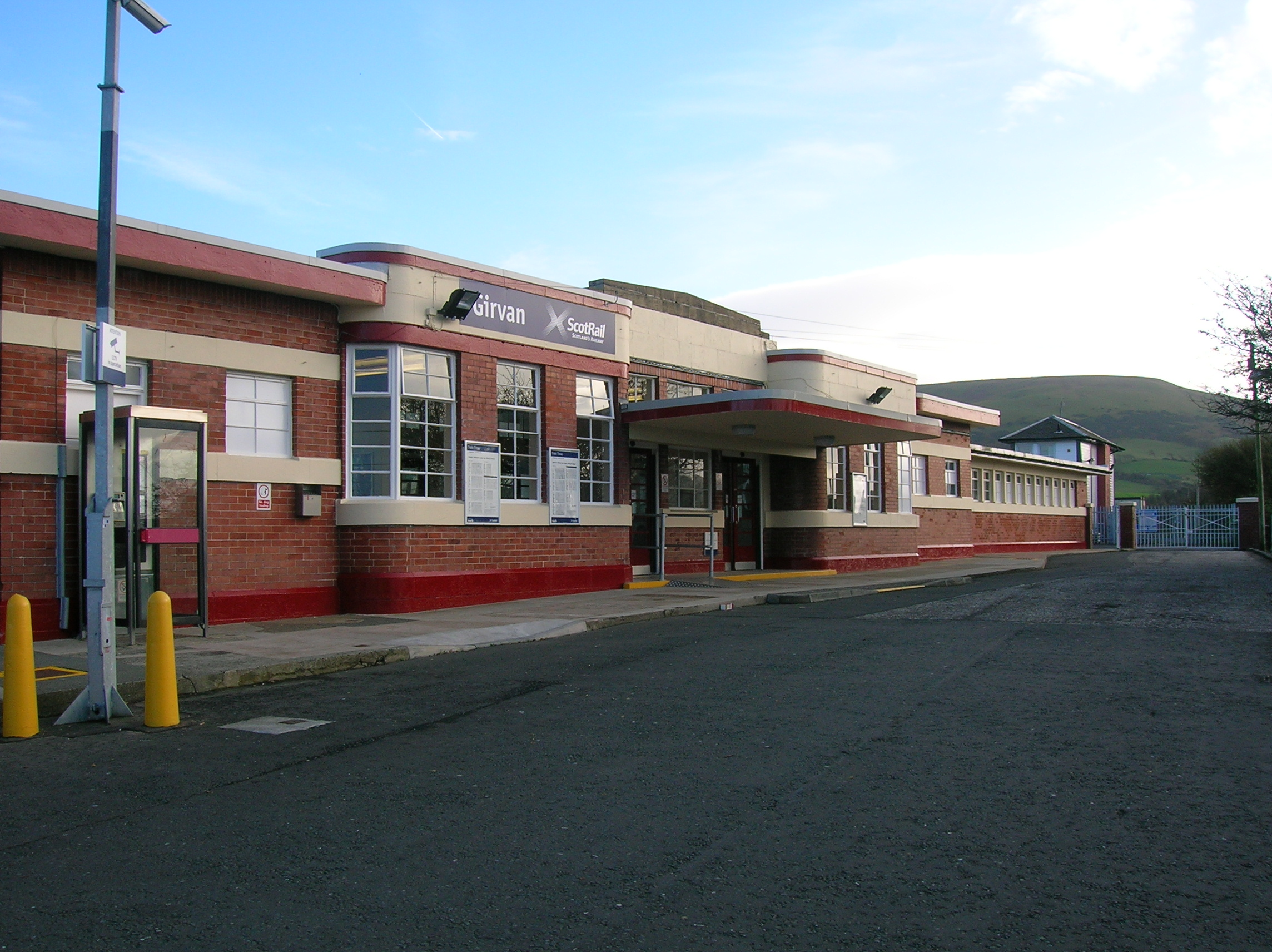
- The exterior of Girvan station

General information
- Location: Girvan, South Ayrshire; Scotland
- Coordinates: 55.2463°N 4.8482°W
- Grid reference: NX190983
- Owner: Network Rail
- Manager: ScotRail
- Transit authority: SPT
- Platforms: 2

Other information
- Station code: GIR

Key dates
- 5 October 1877: Opened as Girvan New
- 1 April 1893: Renamed as Girvan

Passengers
- 2021/22: ▲60,996
- 2022/23: ▲73,744
- 2023/24: ▼56,814
- 2024/25: ▲61,504
- 2025/26: ▲96,840

Listed Building – Category B
- Designated: 14 October 2004
- Reference no.: LB50007
Location
Notes
- Passenger statistics from the Office of Rail and Road

Girvan railway station is a railway station serving the town of Girvan, South Ayrshire, Scotland. The station is managed by ScotRail, who operate all passenger services from there. It is on the Ayr to Stranraer section of the Glasgow South Western Line and is situated 62 miles (100 kilometres) south of Glasgow Central. It has two platforms and is the location of one of the five passing loops on the single track line between Dalrymple Junction (south of Ayr) and Stranraer. Immediately south of the station, the line climbs steeply towards Pinmore tunnel – the climb is known as the Glendoune Bank and has a ruling gradient of 1 in 54.

== History ==
The station was opened on 5 October 1877 by the Girvan and Portpatrick Junction Railway and was known as Girvan New, replacing the Girvan (Old) terminus station of the Maybole and Girvan Railway situated nearby. The station closed on 7 February 1882, reopened 1 August 1883, closed 12 April 1886, reopened 18 June 1886, closed again 2 September 1886, reopened 14 July 1890, and was renamed Girvan on 1 April 1893 after rebuilding by the Glasgow and South Western Railway, who had taken over the G&PJR the previous year. From 1906–1942, it also served as the southern terminus of the Maidens and Dunure Light Railway.

The main station building caught fire in January 1946 and because the London, Midland and Scottish Railway (LMS) were not disposed to finance the rebuilding costs as nationalisation was imminent, rebuilding did not commence until 1949. Owing to shortage of materials it was not completed until August 1951, when based on a typical 1930s LMS design it was re-opened. Along with the signal box, it is a category B listed structure as an example of an early post-war railway station in the Moderne style in Scotland. The station clock restored in 2009 is believed to be from the original station building.

The station is part of the South West Scotland Community Rail Partnership which comprises local Community Councils, representation from South Ayrshire Council, ScotRail as well as private individuals. SWSCRP has adopted the station and has provided tubs, shrubs and plants. These are tended to by the Girvan Make it Happen Group. SWSCRP also have their community shop and an office on site.

The station was the rail head for the 2009 UK Open Golf Championships.

== Services ==
All trains on the Ayr to Stranraer route call, along with several to/from Ayr and beyond start or terminate here. On weekdays and Saturdays, there is a mostly hourly service northbound to/from Ayr with some two-hour gaps. Six of these trains continue to Kilmarnock, of which one continues onward to Glasgow Central. Southbound, there are 5 trains per day to Stranraer, operating at an irregular two or four-hour frequency.

On Sundays, there are five trains a day each way to both Ayr and Stranraer but no services to Kilmarnock or Glasgow.

Preceding station	National Rail	Following station
Barrhill	ScotRail; Glasgow South Western Line	Maybole
	Historical railways	
Junction with G&PJR	Glasgow and South Western Railway; Maidens and Dunure Light Railway	Turnberry; Line closed, station closed
Connection with G&PJR	Glasgow and South Western Railway; Maybole and Girvan Railway	Grangeston Halt; Line open, station closed
Pinmore; Line open, station closed	Glasgow and South Western Railway; Girvan and Portpatrick Junction Railway	Connection with M&GR

== Bibliography ==
- Brailsford, Martyn, ed. (December 2017) [1987]. Railway Track Diagrams 1: Scotland & Isle of Man (6th ed.). Frome: Trackmaps. ISBN 978-0-9549866-9-8.
- Butt, R. V. J. (October 1995). The Directory of Railway Stations: details every public and private passenger station, halt, platform and stopping place, past and present (1st ed.). Sparkford: Patrick Stephens Ltd. ISBN 978-1-85260-508-7. OCLC 60251199. OL 11956311M.
- Jowett, Alan (March 1989). Jowett's Railway Atlas of Great Britain and Ireland: From Pre-Grouping to the Present Day (1st ed.). Sparkford: Patrick Stephens Ltd. ISBN 978-1-85260-086-0. OCLC 22311137.
