= Grangeston Halt railway station =

Railway station in South Ayrshire, Scotland

Grangeston Halt
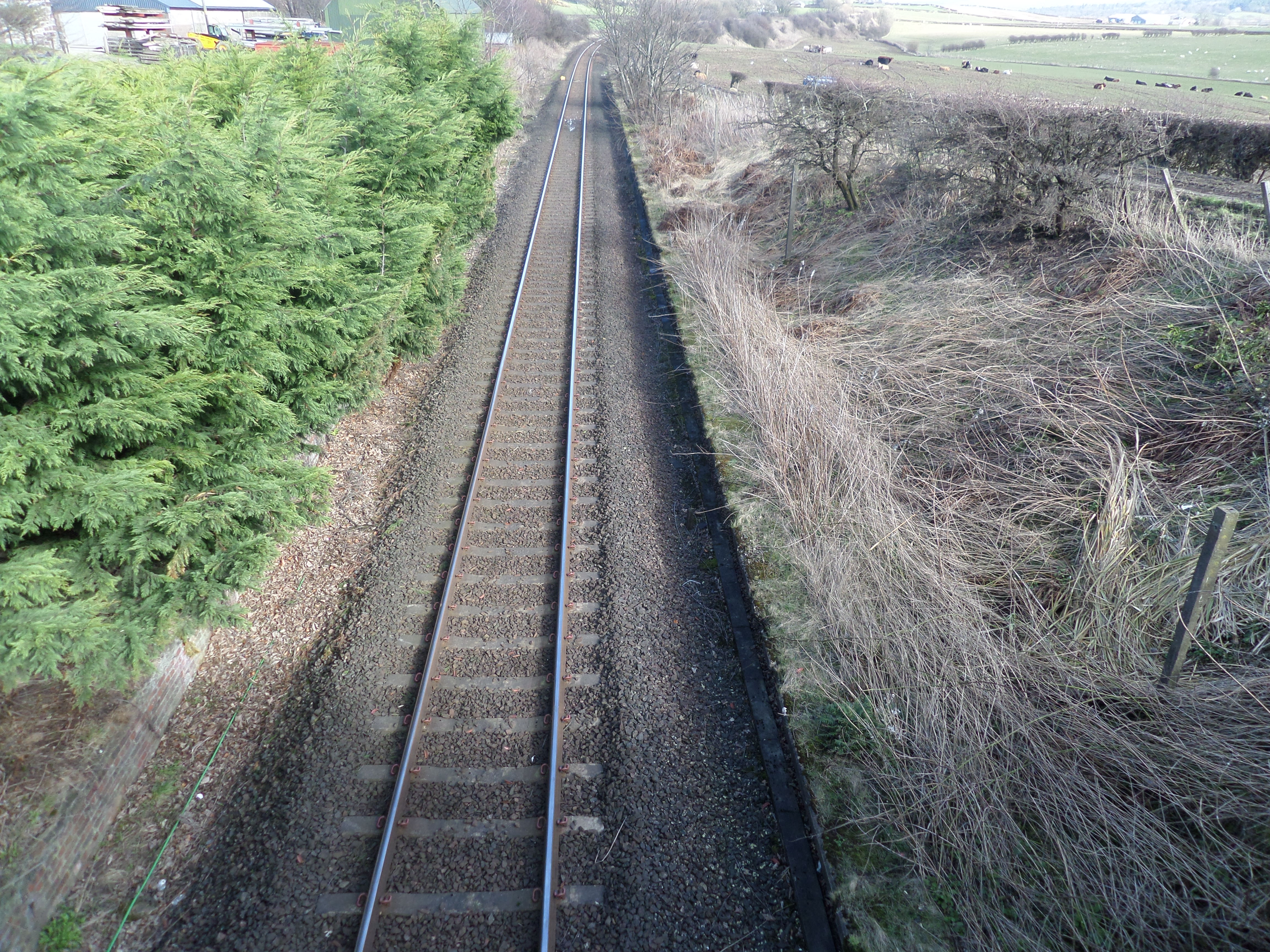
- Grangeston Halt looking towards Ayr

General information
- Location: Between Killochan and Girvan; Scotland
- Coordinates: 55.25871°N 4.82785°W
- Grid reference: NX203997
- Platforms: 2

Other information
- Status: Disused

History
- Original company: London, Midland and Scottish Railway

Key dates
- 15 December 1941: Opened
- 1965: Closed
Location

The Grangeston Halt railway station was a private station that was not listed in the public timetables, located in a rural part of South Ayrshire, Scotland and served the WWII Grangeston ICI munitions plant bringing workers to the site. Grant's Distillery now occupies much of the site of the plant.

== History ==
Where Grant's Distillery is now at Grangeston in WWII was an ICI munitions factory producing flashless cordite that was served by sidings from the Maidens and Dunure line which joined at a north-facing junction. The Grangeston depot was also served by a passenger facility named Grangeston Halt that was located on the Maybole and Girvan Railway line and closed in 1965.

"At the onset of the Second World War (1939-1945), the British Government decided to massively expand its capability to produce explosives for filling shells and as propellant for gun and rifle cartridges. Instead of creating another giant factory like the First World War (1914-1918) munitions works at Gretna and Eastriggs, production was spread around numerous government-run sites like ROF Bishopton near Glasgow and agency industrial works like the ICI explosive works at Ardeer in Ayrshire. ICI saw a need to increase production by establishing six new factories in South West Scotland. These were Ministry of Supply factories run and staffed by ICI as 'Agency Factories'."

=== Station infrastructure ===
The station was located on a double-track section of the line and had a brick built platform with concrete edging. One overgrown platform still exists and the line has been singled.

=== Workings ===
A Southern Railway 0-4-2T locomotive, Stroudley class D1 no. 2284 was allocated to Girvan railway station and Smith records that "It proved useful ... as a substitute for the diesel shunter at Grangeston munitions factory, which shunter that had a habit of breaking down. A two-platform halt was erected at Grangeston and two workers' trains ran to it from Ayr each morning. These trains went on to Girvan station, reversing there and going to Turnberry ... Two similar trains worked back in the evening."

== Micro-history ==
The Grangeston ICI munitions factory was linked to the Maidens and Dunure Light Railway and the tracks were lifted in 1961. An internal narrow gauge railway system existed.

It has been proposed that a freight facility should be built here to serve the industrial estate, to be known as Girvan Grangeston.

Preceding station	National Rail	Following station
Maybole	ScotRail; Glasgow South Western Line	Girvan
	Historical railways	
Killochan; Line open; station closed	Glasgow and South Western Railway; Maybole and Girvan Railway	Girvan; Line open; station open
