= Dailly railway station =

Disused railway station in Dailly, South Ayrshire

Dailly

General information
- Location: Dailly, South Ayrshire; Scotland
- Coordinates: 55.2833°N 4.7392°W
- Grid reference: NS261022
- Platforms: 2

Other information
- Status: Disused

History
- Original company: Glasgow and South Western Railway
- Pre-grouping: Glasgow and South Western Railway
- Post-grouping: London, Midland and Scottish Railway; British Rail (Scottish Region)

Key dates
- 24 May 1860: Opened
- 6 September 1965: Closed
Location

Dailly railway station served the village of Dailly, South Ayrshire, Scotland, from 1860 to 1965 on the Maybole and Girvan Railway.

== History ==
The station was opened on 24 May 1860 by the Glasgow and South Western Railway. On the southbound platform was the station building, to the east was the goods yard and on the north side of the southbound platform was the signal box, which was replaced in 1894. The station closed on 6 September 1965 and the signal box closed later in the same year.

The station building remains and is now a private residence. A caravan park now stands on the site of the former goods yard.

Preceding station	Historical railways	Following station
Kilkerran; Line open, station closed	Glasgow and South Western Railway; Maybole and Girvan Railway	Killochan; Line open, station closed
