= Maybole railway station =

Railway station in South Ayrshire, Scotland

Maybole
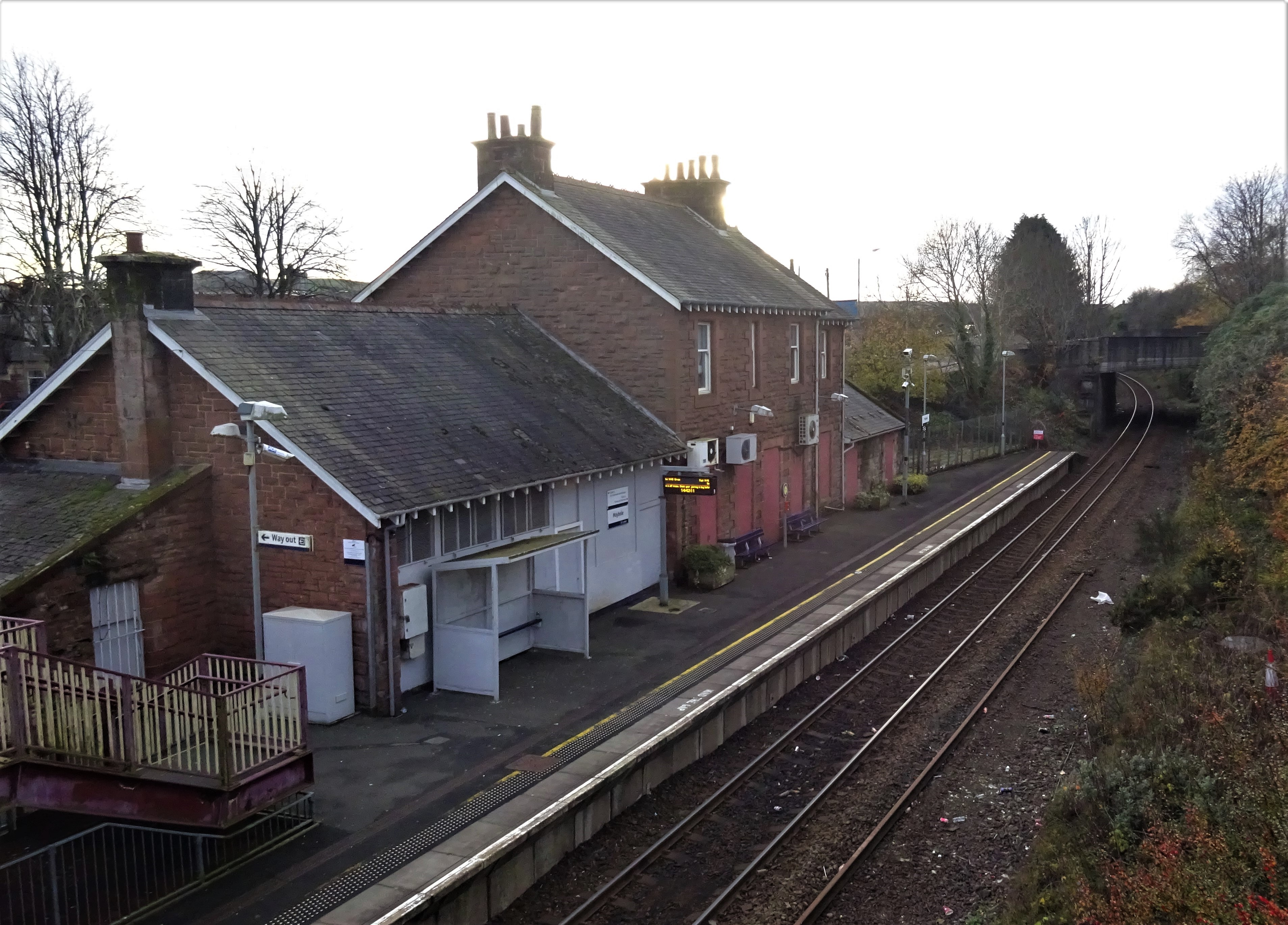

General information
- Location: Maybole, South Ayrshire; Scotland
- Coordinates: 55.3546°N 4.6855°W
- Grid reference: NS298100
- Manager: ScotRail
- Platforms: 1

Other information
- Station code: MAY

Key dates
- 24 May 1860: Opened
- 1880: Rebuilt

Passengers
- 2021/22: ▲41,190
- 2022/23: ▲46,044
- 2023/24: ▼35,930
- 2024/25: ▼35,058
- 2025/26: ▲67,624
Location
Notes
- Passenger statistics from the Office of Rail and Road

Maybole railway station is a railway station serving the town of Maybole, South Ayrshire, Scotland. The station is owned by Network Rail and managed by ScotRail and is on the Glasgow South Western Line.

== History ==
The station was opened on 24 May 1860, originally as part of the Maybole and Girvan Railway (worked and later owned by the Glasgow and South Western Railway). The station replaced the original Maybole station, which was the original terminus of the Ayr and Maybole Junction Railway.

The station was originally a two side platform station rebuilt in 1880, with the two-storey main offices on the down platform, and a large single-storey building with glazed awning on the up platform. When the line was singled in 1973 the northbound platform was removed and the building demolished. The down platform and main building remain, part of which is a local convenience store and part used by Network Rail.

== Services ==
On weekdays and Saturdays northbound, there is a mostly hourly service to Ayr, with some two-hour gaps (14 departures per day in total). Six of these trains continue past Ayr to Kilmarnock, of which one continues onward to Glasgow Central. There is a mostly hourly service to Girvan southbound, with some two-hour gaps. Five of these trains per day continue past Girvan and terminate at Stranraer.

On Sundays, there is a limited service of five trains a day each way, running northbound to Ayr and southbound to Stranraer.

Preceding station	National Rail	Following station
Girvan	ScotRail; Glasgow South Western Line	Ayr
	Historical railways	
Connection to M&GR	Glasgow and South Western Railway; Ayr and Maybole Junction Railway	Cassillis; Line open; station closed
Kilkerran; Line open; station closed	Glasgow and South Western Railway; Maybole and Girvan Railway	Connection to A&MJR
