= Kilkerran railway station =

Disused railway station in South Ayrshire, Scotland

Kilkerran
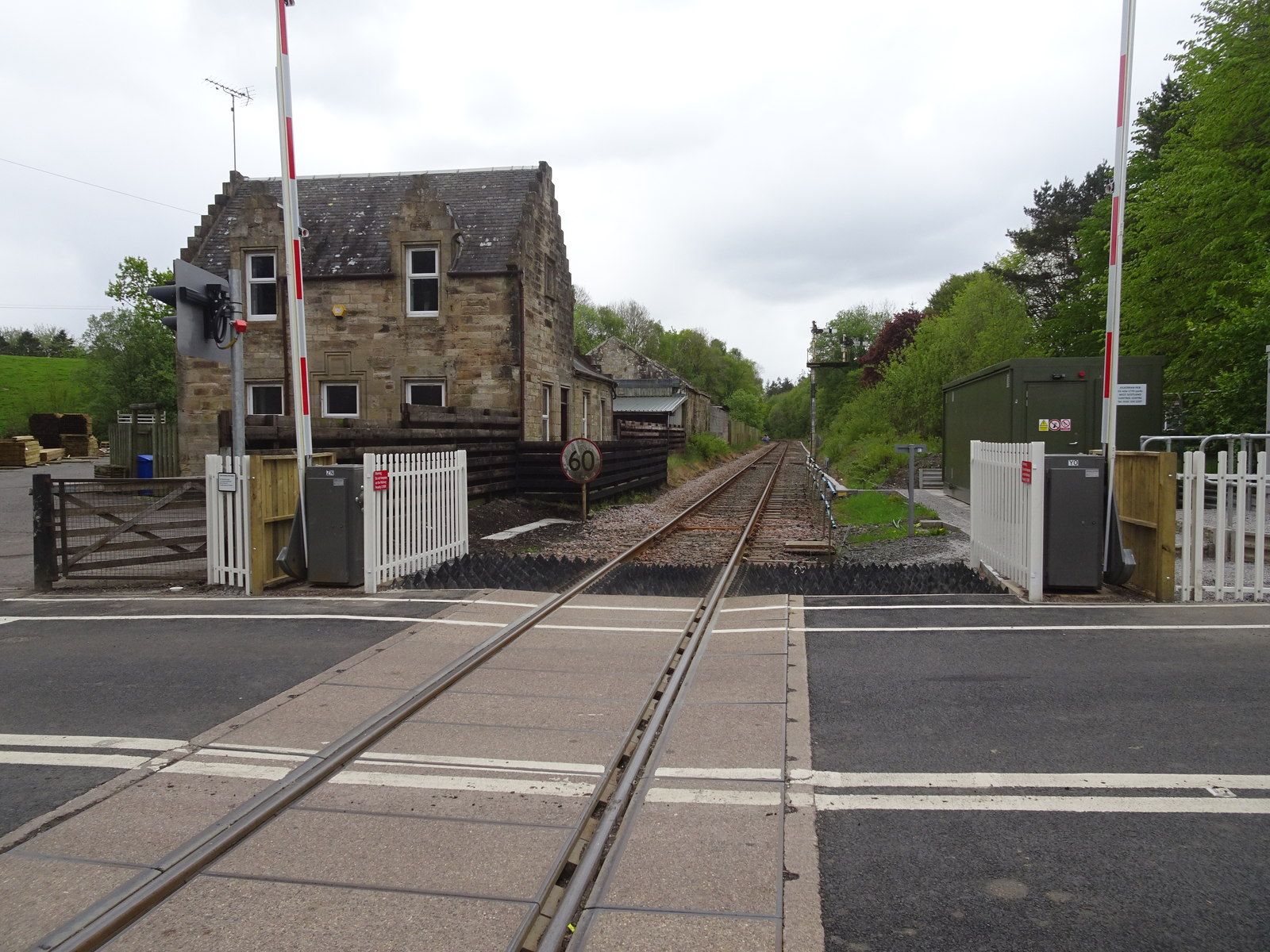
- Station in 2019.

General information
- Location: South Ayrshire; Scotland
- Coordinates: 55.3037°N 4.6844°W
- Grid reference: NS296043
- Platforms: 2 (upon opening); 1 (upon closing)

Other information
- Status: Disused

History
- Original company: Maybole and Girvan Railway
- Pre-grouping: Glasgow and South Western Railway
- Post-grouping: London, Midland and Scottish Railway

Key dates
- 24 May 1860: Opened
- 6 September 1965: Closed
Location

Kilkerran railway station served an area of rural Ayrshire, Scotland from 1860 to 1965 on the Maybole and Girvan Railway.

== History ==
The station opened on 24 May 1860 by the Maybole and Girvan Railway. The station closed to both passengers and goods traffic on 6 September 1965.

Preceding station	Historical railways	Following station
Maybole; Line open, station open	Maybole and Girvan Railway	Dailly; Line open, station closed
