= Ayr and Maybole Junction Railway =

Railway line in Scotland

The Ayr and Maybole Junction Railway (A&MJR) was a railway in Ayrshire, Scotland that provided services between Ayr and Maybole. It opened in 1856 and was seen as a link in providing a through line between Glasgow and Portpatrick, then the ferry port for the north of Ireland.

Although a short line, it succeeded in achieving profitability, eventually being absorbed on generous terms by the Glasgow and South Western Railway.

The line is still in use today as part of the Glasgow South Western Line.

== History ==
=== False starts ===
The Glasgow, Paisley, Kilmarnock and Ayr Railway (GPK&AR) was opened as far as Ayr in 1840, but its Ayr station was on the north bank of the River Ayr. (The GPK&AR was a predecessor company of the Glasgow and South Western Railway.) At this early date, thought was given to reaching Portpatrick, which was the port for a short sea route ferry service to Donaghadee in the north of Ireland.

For a period of time, the GPK&AR had other priorities, but during the frenzy of railway schemes that arose in 1845, a Glasgow and Belfast Union Railway (G&BUR) was promoted; it was supported by the GPK&AR, and its parliamentary costs were partly funded by that company.

Portpatrick seemed to be an important destination for a line, although there was much wild and difficult territory to be crossed to get there: in the same year the British and Irish Union Railway (B&IUR), an independent concern, was proposed to run from Dumfries via Castle Douglas to Portpatrick.

The G&BUR was to run by way of Patna, and a third line was proposed to cross the wild country of Galloway, the Ayrshire and Galloway Railway (A&GR); it would form a junction with the G&BUR at Smithston, near Patna, and run through Dalmellington to Castle Douglas, there linking with the British and Irish Union Railway.

The frenzy of railway schemes lasted for a while but then the bubble burst in 1846, and ambitious and expensive proposals found that they could not get the financial support they needed. The B&IUR announced that it was not proceeding on 21 April 1846, and the A&GR scheme was cut back drastically, to run from Smithston to Dalmellington only, a tiny fraction of its intended extent. It was to have running powers over the G&BUR to reach Ayr.

The G&BUR was authorised in the face of grave financial difficulty, and when the shareholders considered the reality of the situation, the decision was taken not to proceed with construction, and the expensively-won powers were allowed to lapse.

The A&GR scheme had been heavily cut back in Parliament, and with the G&BUR now dormant, it was unable to connect to Ayr, so the promoters put forward a revised scheme in the next Parliamentary session. It won approval and the Ayrshire and Galloway (Smithstown and Dalmellington) Railway received royal assent on 8 June 1847. It would connect with the GPK&AR at Falkland Junction, a short distance north of their terminal station on the north shore of the River Ayr.

=== The Glasgow and South Western Railway ===
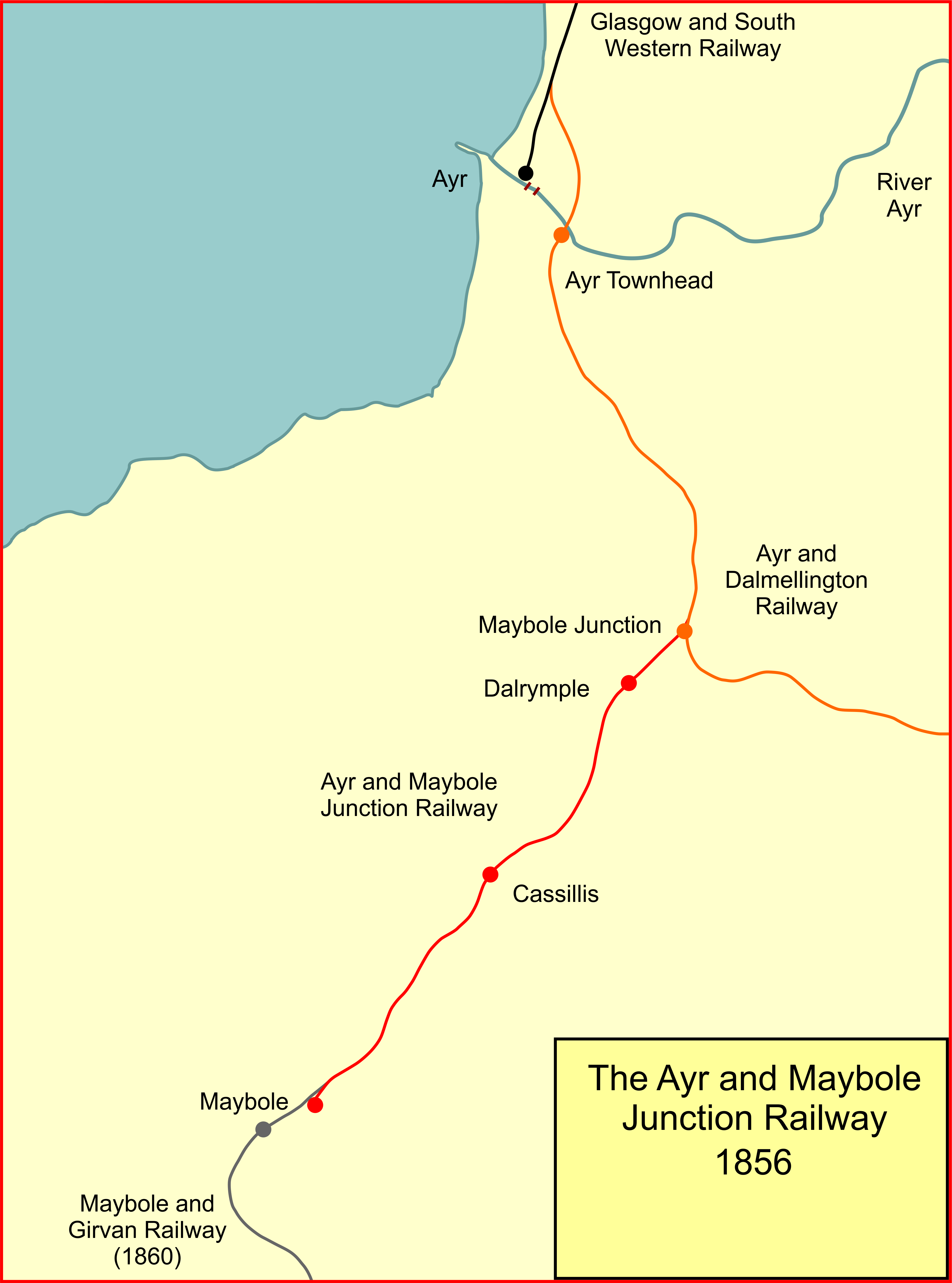
System map of the Ayr and Maybole Junction Railway

In October 1850, the GPK&AR merged with another company and the Glasgow and South Western Railway (G&SWR) was created. The new concern had pressing problems elsewhere, but was happy to encourage local initiatives to promote new lines. The lure of reaching Portpatrick remained, and at the end of 1852, the prospectus for an Ayr, Maybole and Girvan Railway was published. Although it was supported by the G&SWR, this scheme too failed to attract sufficient support, and it came to nothing.

Ayr and Maybole Junction Railway Act 1854
- Act of Parliament
- Parliament of the United Kingdom
- Long title: An Act for making a Railway from the Ayr and Dalmellington Railway near the Cothouses on the Farm of Pleasantfield to the Town of Maybole, to be called "The Ayr and Maybole Junction Railway."
- Citation: 17 & 18 Vict. c. cxlvi

Dates
- Royal assent: 10 July 1854

Text of statute as originally enacted

Yet another truncated scheme was presented to Parliament in the 1854 session, and this time it was passed, as the Ayr and Maybole Junction Railway Act 1854 (17 & 18 Vict. c. cxlvi): the Ayr and Maybole Junction Railway Company was incorporated on 10 July 1854. Capital was to be £33,000 for the line of 5 3/4 miles (9.3 km). The line was to diverge from the (as yet unbuilt) Ayr and Dalmellington line at Dalrymple Junction. The G&SWR was authorised to work the line for 35% of gross receipts for a period of five years, thereafter at a rate to be determined by arbitration. The charge for working the line was considered low by some G&SWR shareholders.

Actual subscription for shares was disappointing, and the G&SWR was obliged to subscribe £10,000 to the scheme.

=== Opening at last ===
The line opened to goods trains on 15 September 1856, but the Inspecting Officer was not satisfied with the ballasting, and opening to passengers was accordingly delayed until 13 October 1856.

Glasgow and South Western and Ayr and Maybole Railways Act 1863
- Act of Parliament
- Parliament of the United Kingdom
- Long title: An Act to enable the Glasgow and South-western Railway Company to use the Railway of the Ayr and Maybole Junction Railway Company, and for other Purposes relating to that Railway.
- Citation: 26 & 27 Vict. c. cxlviii

Dates
- Royal assent: 13 July 1863

Text of statute as originally enacted

In 1863, the working arrangement between the owning company and the G&SWR was due to expire. Much work remained to be done in completing the stations, and the A&MJR had been paying its shareholders handsome dividends but had failed to generate capital to complete the works. An impasse arose over the renewal of the working arrangement, and negotiations to absorb the A&MJR into the G&SWR also failed. The negotiations dragged on and the G&SWR agreed a "perpetual working agreement" with a sliding scale of charges between 39% and 45% of gross receipts. The G&SWR may have been motivated to concede better terms by the fear that the Caledonian Railway might step in. The new terms were ratified by the Glasgow and South Western and Ayr and Maybole Railways Act 1863 of 13 July 1863. The A&MJR chairman was Rigby Wason, and his tenacity is credited with getting good terms for his company.

=== Reaching Stranraer ===
When the company was originally promoted, a direct rail connection between Glasgow and Portpatrick was contemplated; the A&MJR saw itself as a link in that chain. In the event the harbour at Portpatrick was not developed as had been thought, although Stranraer took over as the dominant ferry port. The Portpatrick Railway had expended its meagre resources in reaching Portpatrick from Dumfries, but Rigby Wason launched an attack on the PR for failing to build a line northwards from Stranraer, as he considered had been promised. The word "fraud" was used.

The Portpatrick Railway had no funds to build such a line, but the idea remained as an objective. The gap was closed by two nominally independent companies.

The Maybole and Girvan Railway (M&GR) opened its line on 24 May 1860. The A&MJR terminus at Maybole was at Redbrae, and it was unsuitable for conversion to a through station, so the M&GR by-passed it, building a new through station further west. The old terminus served as a goods yard. The Maybole and Girvan Railway Company succumbed to absorption into the G&SWR in 1865.

The wild territory between Girvan and Stranraer took longer to traverse; the Girvan and Portpatrick Junction Railway opened its line across challenging terrain in 1877. It joined the Portpatrick Railway at Challoch Junction, entering Stranraer over that company's line. It was always in financial difficulties, and however desirable it was to have a direct line between Glasgow and Stranraer, the income generated hardly paid for the outgoings. After an unsuccessful capital reconstruction the line was sold to the G&SWR in 1892.

=== Absorbed by the Glasgow and South Western Railway ===
The A&MJR had long held out for better terms if absorption by the G&SWR was to take place. A guaranteed 5% on capital had been rejected, and in 1871 terms were finally agreed. The Glasgow and South Western Railway Act 1871 (34 & 35 Vict. c. lxxvi) of 29 June 1871 confirmed the absorption of the A&MJR, which had effectively taken place on 1 February 1871. The terms were a remarkable guaranteed 7%. The G&SWR vice chairman was asked to explain the generous terms at the extraordinary general meeting called to ratify the deal, and he replied that "we could not get it for less".

In 1911, the company was finally dissolved and vested in the G&SWR, the 7% dividend guarantee being sustained.

== The present day ==
The Ayr and Maybole Junction line continues in use, as of 2014, as part of the line between Ayr and Stranraer. Passenger services are operated under the brand Glasgow South Western Line. The original Maybole terminus has long been closed.

== Topography ==
The Ayr and Maybole Junction Railway line opened to passenger traffic on 13 October 1856.

The line diverged from the Ayr and Dalmellington line at Dalrymple Junction; from that date there was a station immediately south of the junction, serving both lines, named Maybole Junction, but it closed on 1 December 1859.

The next station was Dalrymple, followed by Cassillis. Both those stations closed to passengers on 6 December 1954.

The Maybole terminus closed to passengers on 24 May 1860 when the Girvan line opened; it remained in use as a goods depot until closure in 1965.

== Connections to other lines ==
- Ayr and Dalmellington Railway at Dalrymple Junction
- Maybole and Girvan Railway at Maybole
