= Girvan and Portpatrick Junction Railway =

Railway line in Scotland

Girvan and Portpatrick Junction Railway (G&PJR) was a railway company in Scotland. It opened in 1877 between Girvan and Challoch Junction, where it joined the Portpatrick Railway, which had already reached Stranraer from Castle Douglas. Portpatrick had been an important ferry terminal for traffic to and from the north of Ireland, but its significance was waning and Stranraer assumed greater importance. The new line formed part of a route between Glasgow, Ayr and Stranraer.

Running through difficult and sparsely populated terrain, the G&PJR was never financially successful, and on two occasions it had to suspend operations to due unpaid debts to adjacent railway companies. In 1887 the company sold its concern at a huge loss to the Ayrshire and Wigtownshire Railway Company (A&WR), formed specially for the purpose. The A&WR hardly performed better, and in turn it sold its business to the Glasgow and South Western Railway (G&SWR) in 1892.

The line remains in operation at the present day, forming part of the Glasgow to Stranraer route.

== History ==
=== The short sea route to the north of Ireland ===
The little harbour at Portpatrick was the starting point for the short sea route from Scotland to the north of Ireland as early as 1620, connecting with Donaghadee in County Down, on the east side of Belfast Lough. Cattle and horses were an important traffic, raised in Ireland and brought into Scotland for butchery, and later Post Office mails became significant: by 1838 8,000 to 10,000 letters passed through the port daily, brought by road coach from Dumfries, and from Glasgow. A barracks was erected in the town to facilitate troop movements between Britain and Ireland. However the limitations of the little harbour became serious disadvantages as other more efficient rail-connected routes, via Liverpool, and later Holyhead became dominant.

=== Railways towards the Port ===
While English destinations via Dumfries and Carlisle were dominant, Glasgow and Central Scotland were obviously significant, and when the Glasgow, Paisley, Kilmarnock and Ayr Railway (GPK&AR) reached Ayr in 1840 it was natural to consider whether an extension to Portpatrick, 60 miles (96 km) away, was feasible. In 1843 a Glasgow and Belfast Union Railway was proposed to achieve the connection, but the plan foundered.

By 1853 the GPK&AR had amalgamated with others to form the Glasgow and South Western Railway (G&SWR), which encouraged the promotion of the Ayr and Maybole Junction Railway which was authorised by the Ayr and Maybole Junction Railway Act 1854 (17 & 18 Vict. c. cxlvi) on 10 July 1854 and opened on 13 October 1856. The line was worked by the G&SWR.

The next extension was the Maybole and Girvan Railway which was authorised on 14 July 1856 and opened on 24 May 1860. It too was worked by the G&SWR, and absorbed by it in 1865. (The Ayr and Maybole line remained independent until 1912.)

Now the Portpatrick Railway was opened between Castle Douglas and Stranraer on 11 March 1861. At Castle Douglas it made connection with other railways giving access to Dumfries and Carlisle, and therefore points in England, as well as Glasgow and Edinburgh by a roundabout route. The Portpatrick Railway, true to its name, had definite intentions to extend from Stranraer to Portpatrick, and did so the following year.

=== Closing the gap from Girvan to Stranraer ===
Girvan and Portpatrick Junction Railway Act 1865
- Act of Parliament
- Parliament of the United Kingdom
- Long title: An Act for making a Railway from Girvan in the County of Ayr to East Challoch in the County of Wigtown; and for other Purposes.
- Citation: 28 & 29 Vict. c. ccclviii

Dates
- Royal assent: 5 July 1865

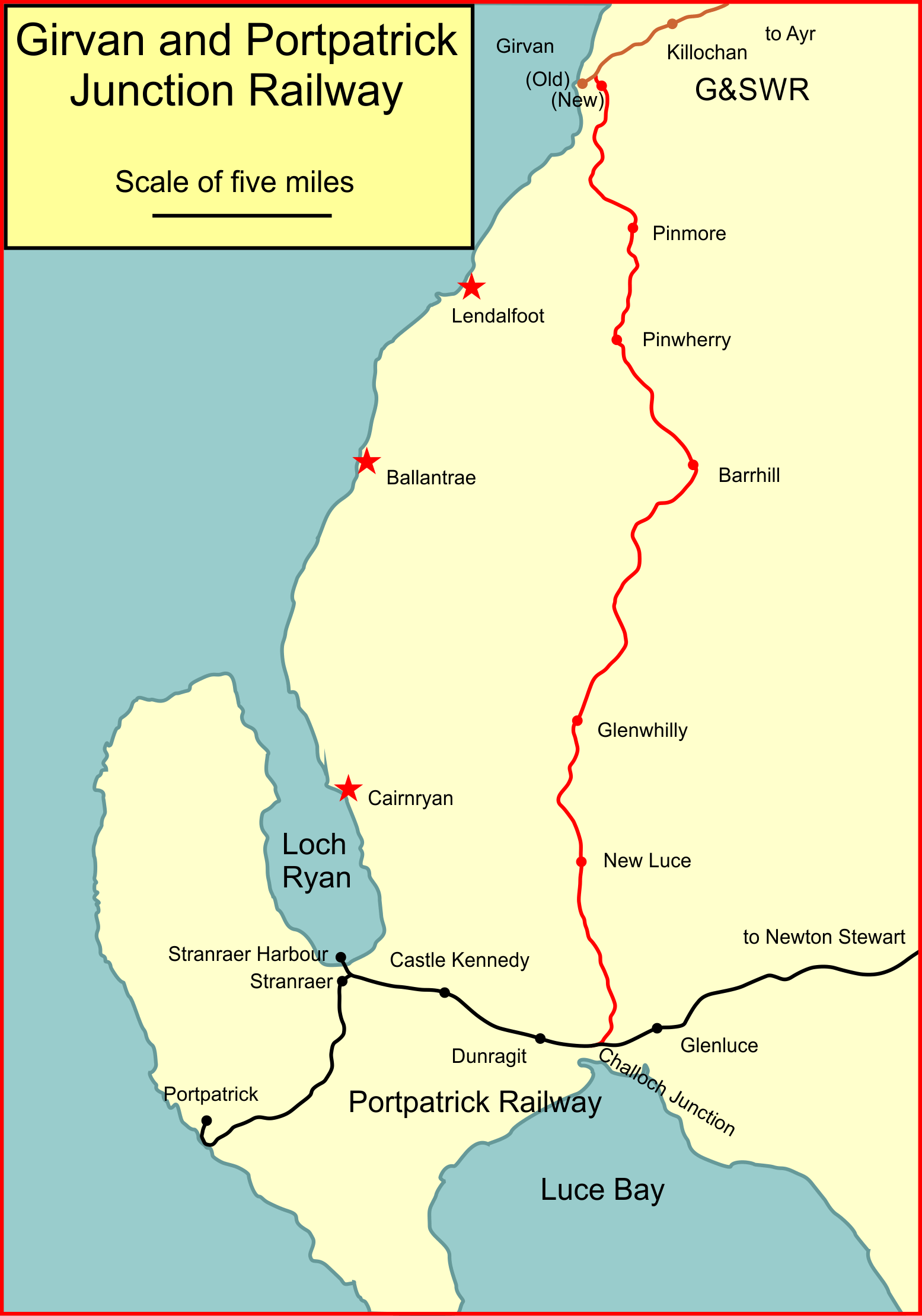
System map of the Glasgow and Portpatrick Junction Railway

These developments encouraged serious consideration of a railway to Portpatrick, although the challenging terrain was a deterrent. However, on 13 November 1862 a prospectus was issued for the Girvan Stranraer and North of Ireland Junction Railway, which was to leave the Maybole and Girvan line 1½ miles (2 km) north of Girvan and join the Portpatrick Railway at Challoch, 10½ miles (17 km) east of Stranraer, taking an inland course between. This scheme did not progress further, but the Girvan and Portpatrick Junction Railway (G&PJR) obtained an authorising act of Parliament, the Girvan and Portpatrick Junction Railway Act 1865 (28 & 29 Vict. c. ccclviii), on 5 July 1865 to follow the same course as the earlier proposed line, except leaving the Maybole and Girvan line immediately north of Girvan station. Capital was to be £250,000.

Girvan and Portpatrick Junction Railway Act 1872
- Act of Parliament
- Parliament of the United Kingdom
- Long title: An Act to confer certain powers on the Girvan and Portpatrick Junction Railway Company over portions of the Portpatrick Railway; and for other purposes.
- Citation: 35 & 36 Vict. c. clxi

Dates
- Royal assent: 6 August 1872

Text of statute as originally enacted

At this time money became scarce and subscriptions to the proposed railway were inadequate; nothing could be done for some years until in 1870 matters eased somewhat, and a contractor, Abraham Pilling of Bolton, undertook to build the line, accepting payment in shares. The civil engineering works were severe, with several significant viaducts and a tunnel being required on the route. Seemingly as an afterthought, the G&PJR applied for running powers between the proposed junction at Challoch and Stranraer; these were ratified by the Girvan and Portpatrick Junction Railway Act 1872 (35 & 36 Vict. c. clxi) of 6 August 1872. This required the G&PJR to shoulder their share of the costs of the jointly used section of railway, and of harbour facilities at Stranraer and at first the Portpatrick Railway, struggling to make ends meet, considered this to be a welcome arrangement.

Pilling too was struggling financially to continue his works due to a trade boom which made wages and materials prices escalate. The G&PJR treated this sympathetically and raised some additional cash to assist him. The struggle took a disastrous turn during stormy conditions on the night of 26 September 1875, when the Stinchar viaduct was completely swept away and several other viaducts and works were substantially damaged.

Once again the company rescued Pilling financially, and the construction work continued.

=== Working the line ===
Now that completion of the construction phase was in sight, the board gave consideration to the working of the line. The G&SWR were approached and agreed to do so for 75% of gross receipts; this figure was thought excessive and talks were opened with Thomas Wheatley, who was successfully working the Wigtownshire Railway. Wheatley advised them to procure rolling stock and work the line themselves, but the directors did not feel confident in that arrangement, so they approached the Caledonian Railway (CR), which was working the Portpatrick Railway. The CR was losing money on the Portpatrick Railway work and politely declined, assuming that the G&PJR would turn back to Wheatley. However this course was not developed and the G&PJR concluded an agreement with the G&SWR to work their line. The CR were alarmed at this: Wheatley, as a small-time independent was not a threat: the G&SWR were a deadly rival.

In 1877 the CR, in effective possession of the Portpatrick Railway, put every possible obstruction in the way of completion of the G&PJR, which needed the junction at Challoch, extensions and improvements at Stranraer, and signalling improvements between those places. Nonetheless the G&PJR line was ready and on 1 October 1877 a trial run was undertaken. At Challoch the special train was prevented from proceeding towards Stranraer, and distinguished guests there expecting to join the train had to be brought to it by road. A second attempt was made in the afternoon and this time the special got through—a banquet awaited them at Stranraer.

=== Public opening ===
The Board of Trade Inspecting Officer had approved the line during his inspection on 24 July 1877, and the G&PJR had started a sporadic goods service between Girvan and New Luce. From 19 September a passenger service—two trains daily—started between New Luce and Girvan. Because the original Maybole and Girvan Railway station at Girvan had been by-passed by the new line, a crude platform was erected on the G&PJR line; it was called Girvan New and the terminus was Girvan Old. This was much less convenient to the town, and was the subject of criticism locally.

On 5 October 1877 a normal public train service started, between Girvan and Stranraer. Four trains ran over the line daily: the fragmented ownership of the route did not need to be respected by the G&SWR, working the whole line. The first southbound and last northbound were expresses, calling only at Ayr, Girvan New, Pinwherry (southbound only) and Dunragit stations, and running to and from the East Pier at Stranraer (described as Stranraer Harbour). Some of the stopping trains may have called at both Girvan Old and New stations; they had to reverse between Girvan Old station and the point of junction of the lines, calling also at Girvan New. It may be that the trains ran only between Girvan New and Stranraer, with road connection between the two stations there.

=== Financial difficulties ===
The G&PJR was responsible for rental payments to the Portpatrick Railway (PPR), calculated on the interest on the original capital cost of construction of their part of that line that they used. The G&PJR was in desperate financial straits: at the shareholders' meeting on 30 April 1878 it was reported that the working arrangement with the G&SWR took over 90% of gross receipts. In 1880 receipts were £16,031 while working expenses were £24,013. The G&PJR failed to pay the PPR, and the Portpatrick Railway Company, in difficult circumstances itself, went to arbitration in 1880; the arbitrator was Sir Thomas Bouch, engineer of the first Tay Bridge, which had collapsed on 28 December 1879, an event known as the Tay Bridge disaster, in which 59 persons perished. Bouch had no difficulty in finding in favour of the Portpatrick Railway's case; the G&PJR lacking the cash to comply, held out.

Since 3 July 1879 the company's affairs had been in the hands of a judicial factor, James Haldane, appointed by the Court of Session. On 31 January 1881 he gave notice to the G&SWR to terminate the working agreement, considered to be the greatest source of the G&PJR's financial problems. However no-one offered a better arrangement, and Haldane was obliged to request the G&SWR to continue the working from month to month on the same basis as before. In any case this was all too late: the Portpatrick Railway took the matter to the Court of Session, which also found in their favour on 1 February 1881. The matter had dragged on that far. From 7 February 1882 G&PJR trains were not allowed on to the Portpatrick Railway. The G&PJR now ran only as far as New Luce, and conveyed passengers and goods to and from Stranraer by road. 2-4-0 locomotive no. 59 operated the service, running tender first half of the time. The service used Girvan Old station, and the New station was temporarily closed.

Girvan and Portpatrick Junction Railway (Arrangement) Act 1882
- Act of Parliament
- Parliament of the United Kingdom
- Long title: An Act to enable the Girvan and Portpatrick Junction Railway Company to raise further moneys, to arrange with their creditors, and to authorise in certain events the sale of the Undertaking.
- Citation: 45 & 46 Vict. c. ccxxix

Dates
- Royal assent: 18 August 1882

Text of statute as originally enacted

Struggling on, the G&PJR obtained authorisation to borrow more money, and the G&SWR was persuaded to mitigate its working charges somewhat; the new arrangement provided a hierarchy of destinations for available income, of which the lowest was "distribution to G&PJR shareholders". A fresh act of Parliament, the Girvan and Portpatrick Junction Railway (Arrangement) Act 1882 (45 & 46 Vict. c. ccxxix) was passed on 18 August 1882 authorising the raising another £30,000 of capital. £20,000 of this was subscribed by the G&SWR. By September 1883 the G&PJR had paid nearly all of the outstanding debt (£12,283), and were permitted to resume running to Stranraer. This actually started on 1 August 1883; the trains used the old station only at Girvan, except the boat trains which used the New station only.

The company's fortunes revived with this arrangement, and at a shareholders' meeting on 31 October 1884 a 1% dividend to Class A Debenture Stock holders was announced.

=== Still more difficulties overcome ===
Girvan and Portpatrick Junction Railway Act 1886
- Act of Parliament
- Parliament of the United Kingdom
- Long title: An Act to confer further powers on the Girvan and Portpatrick Junction Railway Company and for other purposes.
- Citation: 49 & 50 Vict. c. lxxxix

Dates
- Royal assent: 25 June 1886

Text of statute as originally enacted

In 1885 the G&SWR was negotiating to become a part owner of the Portpatrick Railway, giving them their own access to Stranraer. Feeling that the G&PJR was weaker, the G&SWR gave six months notice of termination of the working agreement, and the withdrawal of the £20,000 subscribed under the 1882 act. That act gave the lending companies the power to sell the G&PJR in the event of a default. In self-defence the G&PJR presented a parliamentary bill to repeal that power and to borrow further capital; it also sought running powers over the G&SWR north of Girvan in the hope of connecting with the rival Caledonian Railway. The bill became the Girvan and Portpatrick Junction Railway Act 1886 (49 & 50 Vict. c. lxxxix) on 25 Jume 1886 but without the running powers.

On 12 April 1886 the G&SWR ceased to operate the line, and for a second time it was unable to operate a train service. By now W. T. Wheatley, son of Thomas Wheatley, was general manager of the line, and it fell to him to make working arrangements. He immediately ordered two 0-6-0 locomotives to be built new, and to cover while they were constructed, he acquired three second hand 4-4-0 engines and passenger and goods vehicles from the North London Railway (NLR). £3,600 was paid, with additional money for repairs to the stock carried out by the NLR. By this means Wheatley resumed a train service on 14 June 1886, running everything except the boat train expresses. The NLR engines arrived with condensing apparatus fitted, from their former use in London, and did not have a continuous brake.

Smith illustrates the disparity of the equipment's origin:

[Driver] Bob Scott ran the Paddy [the boat train express for the Irish ferry] with his old North London tank and its train of chain-braked coaches. I wonder who in Bow Works ever imagined that their prosaic suburban tank engine would one day run a boat express over a Scottish moor?

The G&SWR would not allow G&PJR passenger trains to use Girvan (Old) station at first, so the trains terminated at the New station and passengers transferred between the two. From 2 September 1886 this policy was reversed, and the trains used the Old station, reversing to and from the junction, and the New station fell into disuse, except by occasional excursion trains.

In November 1886 the two 0-6- locomotives were delivered from the Neilson and Company factory, and the overstretched locomotive fleet was relieved.

=== Suddenly a takeover ===
Ayrshire and Wigtownshire Railway Act 1887
- Act of Parliament
- Parliament of the United Kingdom
- Long title: An Act to incorporate a Company for the maintaining and working of the Girvan and Portpatrick Junction Railway; and for other purposes,
- Citation: 50 & 51 Vict. c. xl

Dates
- Royal assent: 23 May 1887

If the G&PJR was surviving operationally, its financial situation was plainly desperate, and in financial circles it was clear that a change of ownership was imminent. In the event the Ayrshire and Wigtownshire Railway Company was the successful bidder; the company was formed specially for the purpose by the Ayrshire and Wigtownshire Railway Act 1887 (50 & 51 Vict. c. xl) of 23 May 1887. The actual takeover took place on 1 August 1887.

The G&PJR was authorised to borrow £10,000 for repair works on Pinmore Tunnel and the Stinchar Viaduct and for other expenses prior to the transfer. The sale price was £166,500; the G&PJR had cost £532,000 to build. In May 1887 two new 0-6-0 tender engines were delivered, emblazoned with the Ayrshire and Wigtownshire Railway (A&WR) lettering, having been obtained new from the Clyde Locomotive Company. The new locomotives enabled a morning and evening Stranraer express to be put on in each direction, from 1 June 1887.

Nonetheless the financial performance of the little company was poor; internal traffic was very limited and steamship competition, and the attitude of the G&SWR, affected external business. The A&WR paid some limited dividends, but it was a struggle, and the rolling stock fleet, and particularly the track, was showing signs of wear, and it became public knowledge that the A&WR proprietors would consider selling their concern.

=== The Glasgow and South Western Railway takes over ===
In 1892 the G&SWR took an interest in acquiring the company, possibly motivated by fears of the Caledonian Railway taking an interest. The G&SWR took over the working on 2 February 1892 and acquisition of the A&WR was ratified by the Glasgow and South Western Railway (Ayrshire and Wigtownshire Railway and Bridge Street Joint Station Glasgow) Act 1892 (55 & 56 Vict. c. xcviii) of 20 June 1892. The G&SWR paid £270,000.

Corridor stock was introduced on the boat trains in 1899.

=== After 1923 ===
In G&SWR days the Manson tablet exchange apparatus had been installed on the line, enabling faster transits through crossing stations. In 1923 the main line railways of Great Britain were "grouped" and the line formed part of the London, Midland and Scottish Railway (LMS). The LMS discontinued the use of the Manson apparatus, "as so many locomotives would now need the exchange device to be fitted".

The LMS restored the "Daylight Service" between Larne and Stranraer, and in 1925 London and North Western Railway 42-ton dining cars were added to the connecting trains, 12.25 p.m. from Stranraer and 3.55 p.m. from Glasgow.

The first Sunday excursion from Glasgow to Portpatrick was run in June 1927.

As train loads increased substantially in this period, the short length of the crossing points on the line became a severe limitation: 8 vehicle trains could be crossed at Barrhill, and 9 at Pinwherry and New Luce. A second platform was constructed at Glenwhilly, enabling 12 vehicle trains to be crossed there. During World War II other loops were extended to cope with the heavy traffic.

Locomotive power was also an issue. The turntable at Stranraer was 50 feet (15 m) which had long restricted engine types on this difficult route. The Hughes 2-6-0s had been brought in and found advantageous, but Smith records:

"At the end of March 1939 there came momentous news—official sanction for a 60 ft [18 m]; 4-6-0s to work to Stranraer."

"On 23 March 1939 a trial run was made with a 4-6-0, with the locomotive and tender separated at Stranraer to turn them. There was no prospect of the 60 ft turntable being ready before late summer, so they laid longer rails, projecting at each end, on the existing 50 ft turntable. This allowed them to turn a Class 5 4-6-0. The class 5s began to work from Glasgow to Stranraer on 16 April 1939."

It was about October that the new 60 ft turntable was ready at Stranraer. Class 5X 4-6-0s were drafted in, and were the mainstay of the Stranraer road throughout the war.

Diesel multiple units were introduced on passenger trains from November 1959, but they reverted to locomotive haulage in the period 1984 to 1987. From October 1988, Super Sprinter diesel units were in use.

== Topography ==
The line suspended train working from 7 February to 16 February 1882, and from 12 April to 13 June 1886.

Locations on the line were:

- (Girvan Junction: with Maybole and Girvan Railway);
- Girvan New; after the 7 February 1882 suspension the station reopened on 1 August 1883; and after 14 June 1886 it reopened on 14 July 1890; it was renamed Girvan on 1 April 1893;
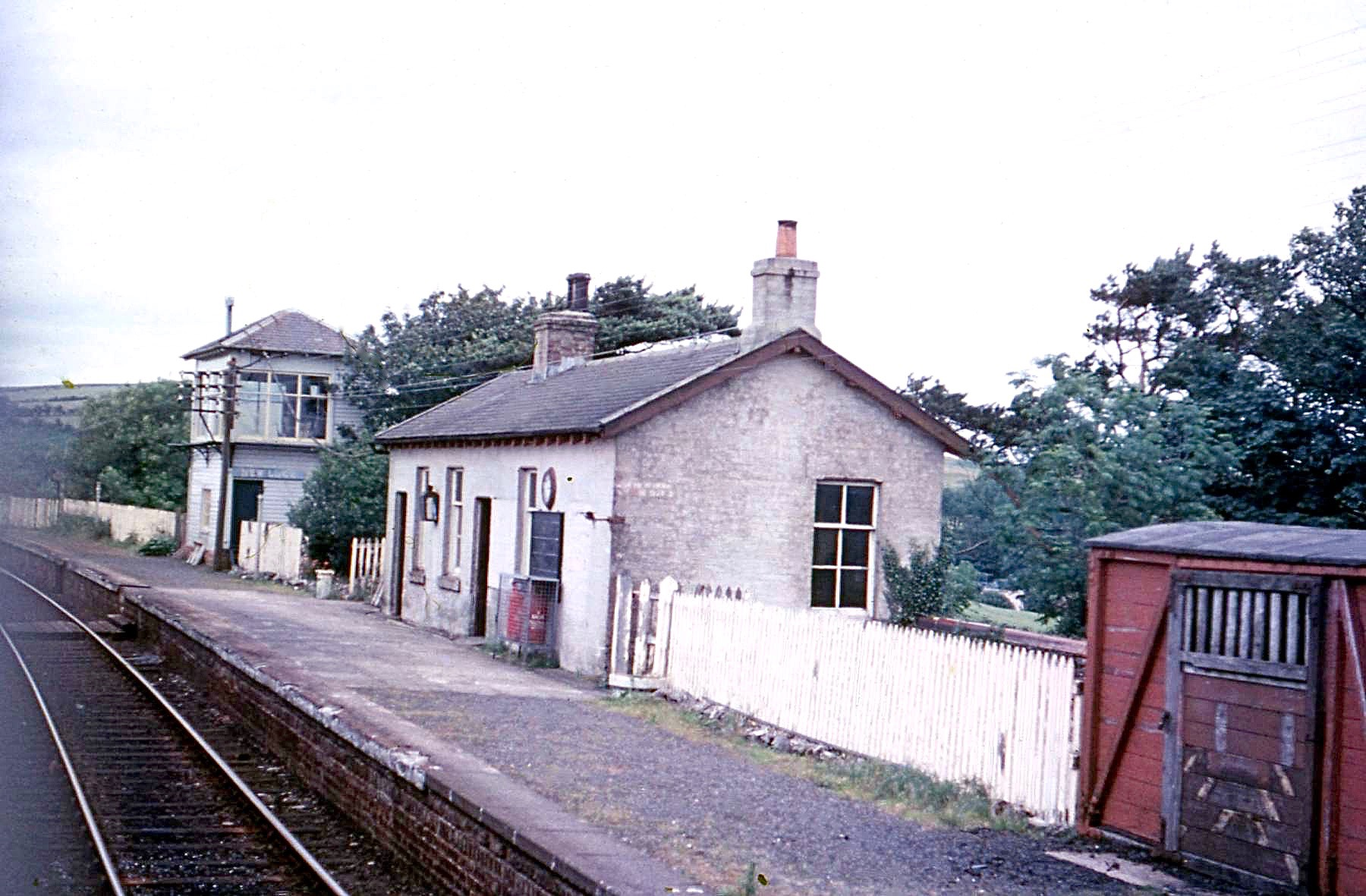
- New Luce in 1970
  Pinmore; closed 6 September 1965;
- Pinwherry; closed 6 September 1965;
- Barrhill;
- Glenwhilly; closed 6 September 1965;
- New Luce; closed 6 September 1965; demolished 1971
- (Challoch—crossing loop);
- (Challoch Junction: with Portpatrick Railway).

Girvan Old — the Maybole and Girvan Railway station—closed on 1 April 1893.

Gradients on the line were severe; from Girvan Junction the line climbed at a ruling gradient of 1 in 54 to Pinmore, altitude 394 feet (120 m), and then fell at 1 in 69 to Pinwherry. There followed an eight-mile climb at 1 in 67 to a summit at 690 feet (210 m); then there was a long descent at up to 1 in 56 all the way to Challoch Junction.

== Ayrshire and Wigtownshire Railway ==
The Ayrshire and Wigtownshire Railway (A&WR) was the short-lived railroad that merged with the Girvan and Portpatrick Junction Railway. It took over a financially troubled 32-mile route connecting Girvan to Challoch Junction near Stranraer, completing a critical link between Glasgow and the Irish ferry ports.

== Current operations ==
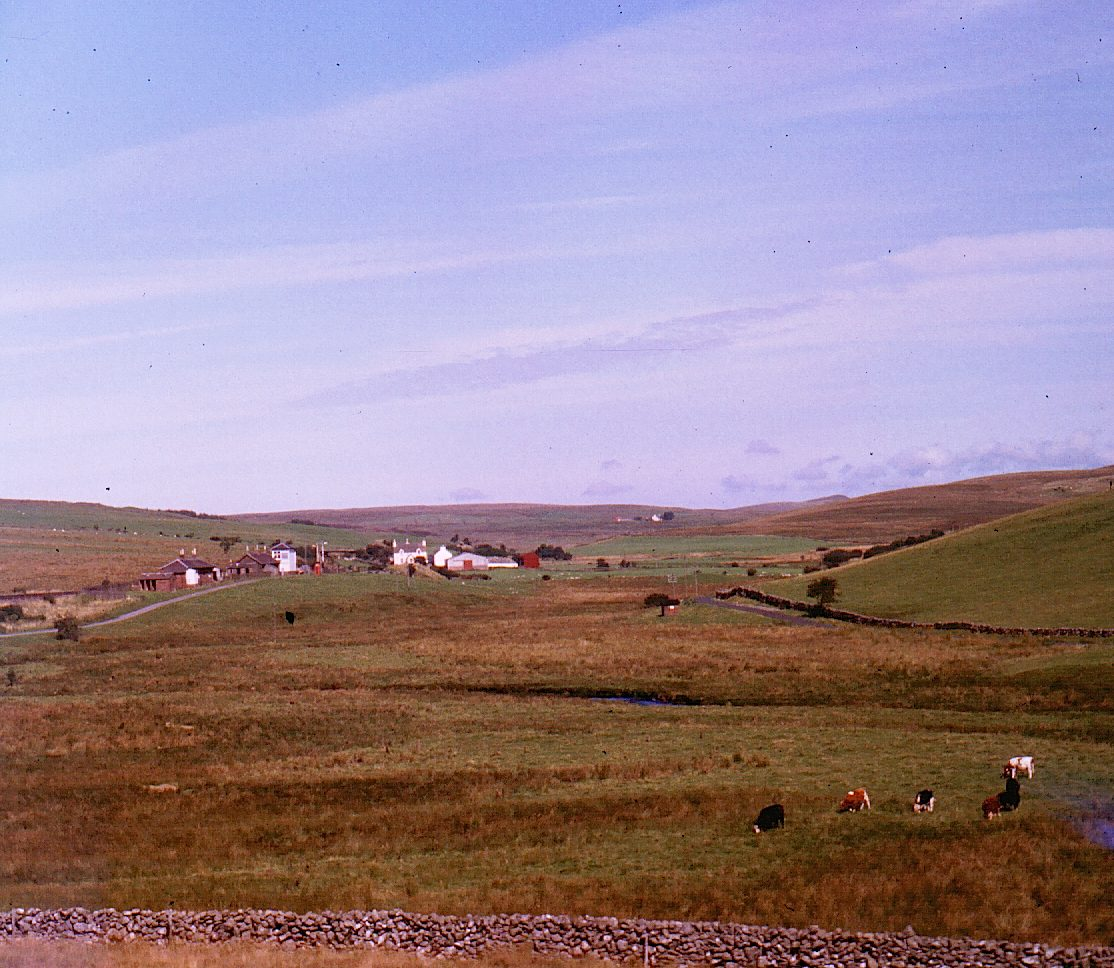
Glenwhilly station in August 1980

The line remains open throughout, as part of the Glasgow South Western Line between Glasgow and Stranraer, although all the intermediate stations apart from Barrhill were closed in 1965. Regular freight services to and from the depot at Stranraer Town operated over the line until the early 1990s, but these ceased following the withdrawal of the Railfreight Distribution wagon load service by British Rail in 1993. The passenger service was irregular (with large gaps between trains) up until 2015 as it operated mainly in conjunction with the Belfast ferry sailings and is constrained to some degree by the single track nature of the line (there are only three passing loops on the line south of Girvan, at Barrhill, Glenwhilly and Dunragit).

The line is currently a key part of the Carrick & Wigtownshire Community Rail Partnership SAYLSA which comprises local community councils, representation from South Ayrshire Council, First ScotRail as well as private individuals.

A recently completed rail study commissioned by the SPT, Passenger Focus and SWestrans has recommended that the timetable be recast where possible to encourage new passenger business (mainly by providing a more evenly spaced service) and also to seek to develop new freight flows such as timber from Barrhill, grain from Girvan and intermodal traffic between Northern Ireland and Scotland (and beyond).

A timetable recast by current franchise holders Abellio in December 2015 increased the service frequency on the line by 50% (from six trains each way up to nine on weekdays, running every two hours) but removed the direct link to Glasgow via Kilwinning; all services now operate to/from Kilmarnock on weekdays & Saturdays (a limited number are extended from there to or from Glasgow) and terminate/start from Ayr on Sundays.

== Bibliography ==
- Awdry, Christopher (1990). Encyclopaedia of British Railway Companies. Sparkford: Patrick Stephens Ltd. ISBN 1-8526-0049-7. OCLC 19514063. CN 8983.
- Butt, R. V. J. (October 1995). The Directory of Railway Stations: details every public and private passenger station, halt, platform and stopping place, past and present (1st ed.). Sparkford: Patrick Stephens Ltd. ISBN 978-1-85260-508-7. OCLC 60251199. OL 11956311M.
- Jowett, Alan (March 1989). Jowett's Railway Atlas of Great Britain and Ireland: From Pre-Grouping to the Present Day (1st ed.). Sparkford: Patrick Stephens Ltd. ISBN 978-1-85260-086-0. OCLC 22311137.
