= Maybole and Girvan Railway =

Railway in Scotland

The Maybole and Girvan Junction Railway was a railway company that constructed a line between Maybole and Girvan. Although promoted independently, it was supported by the Glasgow and South Western Railway, and was seen as part of a trunk line connecting Glasgow with a ferry port for the north of Ireland.

Its route remains open at the present day, carrying a moderate passenger train service between Ayr and Girvan, with some trains running from Glasgow to Stranraer.

== History ==
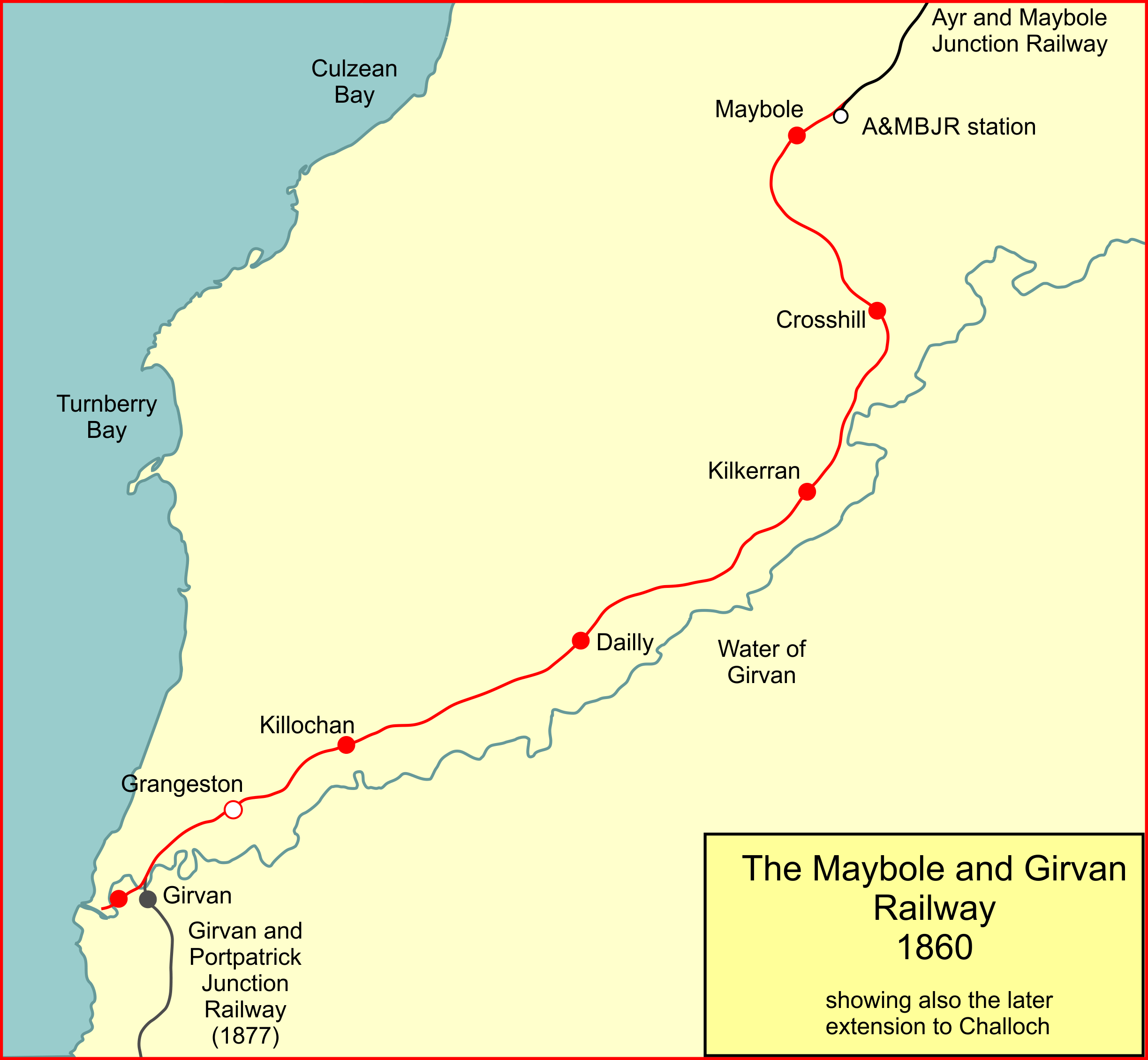
System map of the Maybole and Girvan Railway

Portpatrick had long been a port for shipping between Scotland and Donaghadee in the north of Ireland, since at least 1620. When railways were being developed in the south-west of Scotland it was considered essential to connect Portpatrick with the main line system, but the difficult and sparsely populated terrain made that a difficult proposition.

A line was completed in 1840 between Glasgow and Ayr, by the Glasgow, Paisley, Kilmarnock and Ayr Railway, and the Glasgow, Dumfries and Carlisle Railway connected Carlisle and Dumfries in 1848. Those two companies merged in 1850 to form the Glasgow and South Western Railway (G&SWR), which became the dominant railway company in the south west of Scotland. However Ayr and Dumfries were a considerable distance from Portpatrick.

In 1845 a scheme named the Glasgow and Belfast Union Railway (G&BUR) was formed, and obtained authority in the Glasgow and Belfast Union Railway Act 1846 to build a line; this had been promoted during a period of frenzy for railway projects, but in the following year the financial bubble burst, and it became impossible to get money. The G&BUR allowed its powers to lapse without any construction taking place.

The Portpatrick Railway was the first line to connect Portpatrick: it did so in 1861, but its line led towards Carlisle (over other companies' lines) and Portpatrick was still only accessible from Glasgow by a roundabout route.

The G&SWR, by now firmly entrenched in the area but fearful of an incursion by the rival Caledonian Railway, encouraged local promoters to propose schemes, and the G&SWR supported them financially in most cases. The Ayr and Maybole Junction Railway opened in 1856, so that Maybole was now connected to Glasgow directly.

=== The Maybole and Girvan Railway authorised ===
During the construction of the Ayr and Maybole Junction line, a "Committee of Noblemen and Gentlemen" led by Sir James Fergusson of Kilkerran decided to form a company for the purpose of building a railway from Maybole to Girvan, and improving the jetty and harbour there. The cost of the scheme was estimated at £62,000. The G&SWR was supportive, and a working arrangement was finalised whereby the G&SWR would work the line for 42½% of gross receipts. The G&SWR agreed to subscribe £12,000 and when the cost estimate rose of £70,000 later in the year, the G&SWR contribution rose to £20,000. The G&SWR shareholders were not unanimously in favour of this kind of cash support, and the chairman had to declare that, "It must be apparent to the shareholders that in going to Girvan the directors were pointing Lochryan".

Maybole and Girvan Railway Act 1856
- Act of Parliament
- Parliament of the United Kingdom
- Long title: An Act for making a Railway from the Town of Maybole to the Town and Harbour of Girvan, to be called "The Maybole and Girvan Railway."
- Citation: 19 & 20 Vict. c. xcix

Dates
- Royal assent: 14 July 1856

Text of statute as originally enacted

It got its authorising act of Parliament, the Maybole and Girvan Railway Act 1856, without difficulty on 14 July 1856; the capital was £68,000 and the line was to be 12 1/2 miles (20 kilometres) in length.

=== Construction, and opening ===
Maybole and Girvan Railway (Amendment) Act 1859
- Act of Parliament
- Parliament of the United Kingdom
- Long title: An Act to enable the Maybole and Girvan Railway Company to raise additional Capital; to authorize a Deviation of their Line; and for other Purposes.
- Citation: 22 & 23 Vict. c. xxxiv

Dates
- Royal assent: 21 July 1859

The construction, undertaken by William Aiton and his company, process was very slow, and extra cash to the extent of £34,000 was needed by the company; the G&SWR provided £11,000. The cost of land acquisition had been £8,000 above the estimated cost, and £7,000 was expended on bridges where level crossings had originally been planned. The extra money needed was created by persuading the main contractor, William Aiton, to take 200 shares in payment, and by raising £34,000 in preference shares.

The main line finally opened for traffic on 24 May 1860, although the harbour branch, an extension beyond the passenger terminus, a second bridge over the Water of Girvan, and the jetty were not ready at this stage. (Note: Carter says that the line was partly opened in August 1859 and fully open on 21 May 1860.) Notwithstanding the apparent desire to reach Portpatrick, the station was not laid out to enable onward running southwards.

=== Poor financial performance ===
On 8 March 1861 the shareholders heard the first half-yearly report. The surplus on trading for the half year had been a disappointing £1,176; this was only enough to pay a dividend on the preference shares; in fact the company never paid a dividend to ordinary shareholders. By 1862 it was evident that this sluggish performance was to be the norm. Indeed, the company had run out of cash with work still to be done to complete the line. The G&SWR was asked to finance the work, which it did, deducting the advance from the surplus on operations.

Local interest had been created in Girvan in sponsoring a line onward towards Portpatrick, but the obvious plight of the Maybole and Girvan suppressed any actual action in that direction.

=== Absorbed by the Glasgow and South Western Railway ===
An underperforming local line worked by a larger sponsoring company could only end with absorption, and by the terms of the Glasgow and South-western Railway (Amalgamations) Act 1865 of 5 July 1865, the Maybole and Girvan Railway was absorbed by the larger company. the 4% preference shareholders got 4% preference shares in the G&SWR, but the ordinary shareholders only got £35 per cent. The absorption took effect on 1 August 1865.

The Maybole to Girvan line was now simply a part of the G&SWR, but the aspiration to extend the line to Stranraer—Portpatrick was now no longer the prime destination for Ireland—remained, but the G&SWR did not have the resources to build the line itself. The Girvan and Portpatrick Junction Railway got an authorising act of Parliament, the Girvan and Portpatrick Junction Railway Act 1865, on 5 July 1865 to build from Girvan to Challoch Junction on the Portpatrick Railway, some distance east of Stranraer. Funding the difficult construction through wild territory was difficult, and it was not until 19 September 1877 that the line opened.

Because of the configuration of Girvan station, the new line started from a junction a short distance north of the terminal, and a new through station off Vicarton Street was built. The finances of the new company were shaky and relations with existing railways were difficult, but in time matters settled down. A consistent through passenger service between Glasgow and Stranraer was operated.

For some time both passenger stations at Girvan were used for passenger traffic, but the original Girvan station ceased handling passengers in 1892 and became a goods depot.

== Modern operation ==
Diesel multiple units started operating over the line between Glasgow and Stranraer in 1959, with the current Class 156 Sprinters commencing in October 1988.

== Topography ==
The line runs in a general south-westerly direction from Maybole through farmed countryside to Girvan, a fishing port on the Irish Sea. It passes a former coal mine at Bargany. The line consists of a single track with a passing loop at Kilkerran. The line was double tracked between 1893 and 1973.

The line opened on 24 May 1860. The intermediate stations closed on 6 September 1965 except where noted; Maybole remains open on the present-day line; the original M&GR Girvan station is closed.

Stations:

- Maybole
- Crosshill. Closed 1 March 1862. Since the end of July 1861 there had been "a service of one train on Tuesdays only".
- Kilkerran
- Dailly
- Killochan. Closed 1 January 1951.
- Grangeston. Unadvertised station. Opened 15 December 1941, closed 1965.
- Girvan. Renamed Girvan Old on 5 October 1877 when the new station on the Portpatrick line opened. Closed to passengers on 1 April 1893.

North of Kilkerran on the west of the line there was a small factory referred to as the Acid Works, or sometimes the Secret Works. which was a landmark for drivers.

Grangeston was opened in 1941 to serve a munitions factory adjacent. It was not advertised in public timetables. Local mapping shows the location also as Grangetown or Grangestone, although Quick, Butt and Smith refer to it as Grangeston Halt. There was a rail connection to sidings in the depot, served from the Maidens and Dunure line.

Smith refers to a Southern Railway 0-4-2T locomotive, Stroudley class D1 no. 2284 being allocated to Girvan.

"It proved useful ... as a substitute for the diesel shunter at Grangeston munitions factory, 1 1/4 miles [2 kilometres] north of Girvan, which shunter had a habit of breaking down. A two-platform halt was erected at Grangeston, and two workers' trains ran to it from Ayr each morning. These trains went on to Girvan station, reversing there and going to Turnberry ... Two similar trains worked back in the evening."

== Connections to other lines ==
- Ayr and Maybole Junction Railway at Maybole (the line diverged from the Ayr route a short distance from the original terminus at Maybole Old).
- Girvan and Portpatrick Junction Railway at Girvan Junction
- Maidens and Dunure Light Railway Girvan Junction

== Current operations ==
As of 2016, passenger trains operate over the line from Ayr to Girvan usually as part of a Kilmarnock to Girvan or Glasgow to Stranraer service operated by ScotRail. There has been no regular freight service since 1993.

== Sources ==
- Awdry, Christopher (1990). Encyclopaedia of British Railway Companies. Sparkford: Patrick Stephens Ltd. ISBN 1-8526-0049-7. OCLC 19514063. CN 8983.
- Butt, R. V. J. (October 1995). The Directory of Railway Stations: details every public and private passenger station, halt, platform and stopping place, past and present (1st ed.). Sparkford: Patrick Stephens Ltd. ISBN 978-1-85260-508-7. OCLC 60251199. OL 11956311M.
- Jowett, Alan (March 1989). Jowett's Railway Atlas of Great Britain and Ireland: From Pre-Grouping to the Present Day (1st ed.). Sparkford: Patrick Stephens Ltd. ISBN 978-1-85260-086-0. OCLC 22311137.
- Railscot on the Maybole and Girvan Railway
