= Killochan Castle =

Tower house in South Ayrshire, Scotland

Coordinates: 55.2651°N 4.7916°W

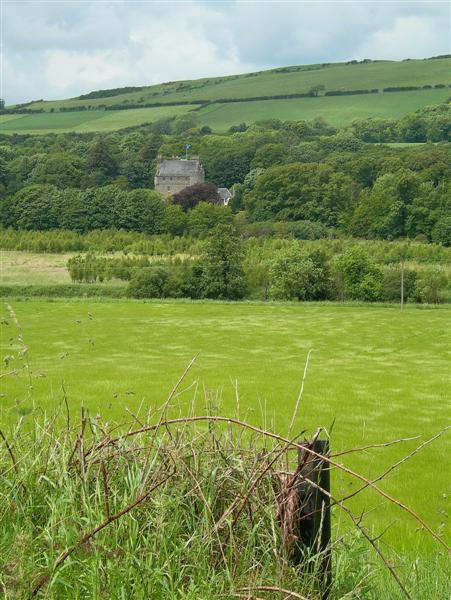
Towards Killochan Castle in 2007.

Killochan Castle is a 16th-century L-plan tower house about 3 miles (4.8 km) north east of Girvan, South Ayrshire, Scotland, north of the Water of Girvan, and south of Burnhead.

The castle is well-preserved and occupied. It has been a Category A Listed building since 1971.

== History ==
From the 14th century the Cathcart family owned the property. Robert Cathcart of Killochan died at the battle of Flodden in 1513. When the Kennedys of Cassillis and Bargany feuded the Cathcarts supported their Bargany neighbours, with John Cathcart, who built the castle, commanding the rearguard at the battle of Pennyglen.

The present castle, dating from 1581, probably replaces an earlier one on the same, or a nearby, site. A wing and two extra floors were added to the tower in 1586 by Jhone Cathcart. Some outbuildings were demolished during the 18th century and "a beautifully proportioned new wing, courtyard and gatehouse" were added.

In the late 19th century the castle was owned by Col. Alexander Brown Grant MVO DL and his wife Helen Underwood Marr, parents to Rev Alexander Brown Grant.

=== 20th and 21st centuries ===
The castle was occupied by the Cathcart family, intermittently, until 1954 when it was sold.

The property was purchased by Princess Viola von Hohenzollern in 1997 from Michael Knighton, former owner of Carlisle United FC. In 2010, Country Life published this description of the castle:

"Refurbished and modernised in the 1990s, Killochan Castle, set in 131 acres of beautiful gardens and woodlands overlooking Girvan Water, has six reception rooms, two bedroom suites, six further bedrooms, three bathrooms and a steward’s flat; the gatehouse has a drawing room, kitchen/dining room, three bedrooms and a bathroom".

Reports in October 2012 stated that the castle had been sold and that the contents were to be sold at auction because the new owner did not want most of them. "Some of the objects in the sale were acquired with the house and many others were added by me", the Princess explained. The buyer of the property was described as a Saudi businessman.

In 2020. the property was again listed for sale; Country Life reported that the castle had been "completely restored five years ago".

== Structure ==
Killochan castle has been described as one of the finest fortified houses in south Scotland. The castle has a five-storey main block, lying east to west, with a higher wing extending northward at the east end. In the re-entrant angle there is a square stair tower, while there is a round tower, with a corbelled-out parapet at one corner. The top of the tower is crowned by two bartizans.

There is an unusually high parapet on the south side, while the eaves are unbroken by dormers.

There are shot-holes in the walls, while the entrance is defended by a parapet-level machiolated projection.

A wide scale-and-platt stair leads from the entrance to the first floor; whence other floors may be reached by way of a turnpike stair in the re-entrant angle. The hall, and an adjoining chamber, are on the first floor.

The basement, which contained the kitchen and two cellars, is vaulted.

Oak wall panelling removed from the castle, and displayed at the National Museum of Scotland in Edinburgh, has carved figures of members of the Cathcart family, and includes the coat of arms of John Cathcart and his wife Helen Wallace, who married in 1563.

The 18th-century wing has two storeys.
