= Glasgow and South Western Railway =

British pre-grouping railway company

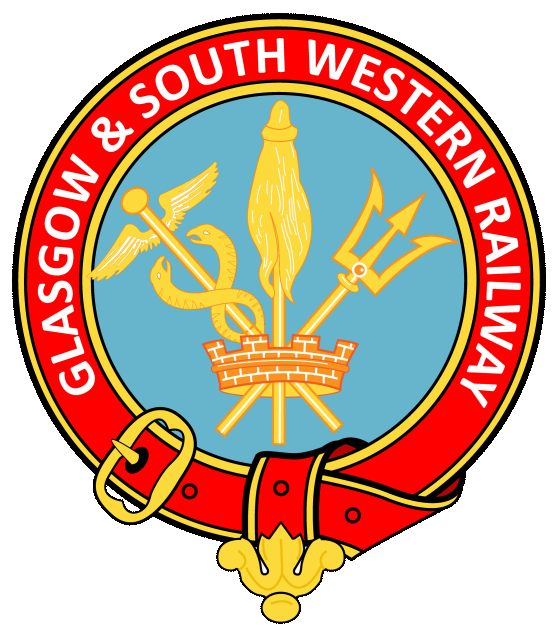

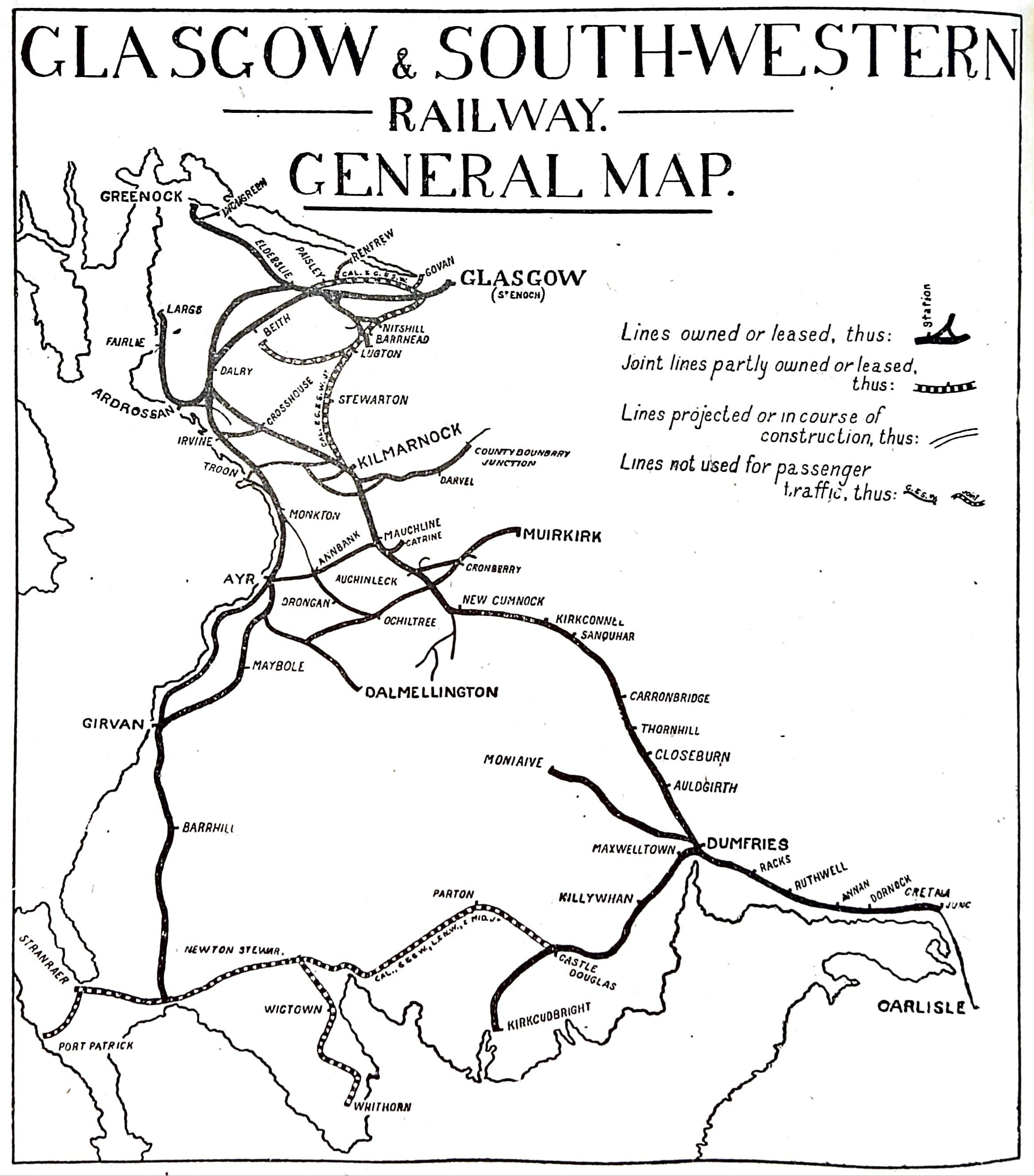

Overview
- Headquarters: Glasgow
- Locale: Scotland
- Dates of operation: 1850; 176 years ago – 1923; 103 years ago
- Predecessor: Glasgow, Paisley, Kilmarnock and Ayr Railway and Glasgow, Dumfries and Carlisle Railway
- Successor: London, Midland and Scottish Railway

Technical
- Track gauge: 4 ft 8 1/2 in (1,435 mm) standard gauge
- Length: 493 miles 38 chains (794.2 km) (1919)
- Track length: 1,141 miles 64 chains (1,837.5 km) (1919)

The Glasgow and South Western Railway (G&SWR) was the third biggest of the five major Scottish railway companies prior to the 1923 Grouping. It served a triangular area of south-west Scotland between Glasgow, Stranraer and Carlisle. It was formed on 28 October 1850 by the merger of two earlier railways, the Glasgow, Paisley, Kilmarnock and Ayr Railway and the Glasgow, Dumfries and Carlisle Railway. Already established in Ayrshire, it consolidated its position there and extended southwards, eventually reaching Stranraer. Its main business was mineral traffic, especially coal, and passengers, but its more southerly territory was very thinly populated and local traffic, passenger and goods, was limited, while operationally parts of its network were difficult.

It later formed an alliance with the English Midland Railway and ran express passenger trains from Glasgow to London with that company, in competition with the Caledonian Railway and its English partner, the London and North Western Railway, who had an easier route. In 1923 the G&SWR formed a constituent of the London Midland and Scottish Railway group.

Much of the network remains active at the present day; Glasgow commuting particularly has developed, and parts of the network have been electrified. Many of the earlier mineral workings, and branches constructed to serve them, have ceased, and many local passenger stations in rural areas have closed.

In 1921 the G&SWR had 1,128 miles (1,815 km) of line (calculated as single track extent plus sidings) and the company’s capital was about £19 million.

== History ==
=== Before the G&SWR ===
In the early 1830s, there were already several mineral railways operating in Scotland; local in extent, they were mostly built to serve coal mines and other mineral activity. The successful operation of the Liverpool and Manchester Railway as an inter-city line, and then the Grand Junction Railway reaching northwards, caused railway promoters in the west of Scotland to consider that one day, there might be a through railway line to London.

The Glasgow, Paisley, Kilmarnock and Ayr Railway (GPK&AR) was authorised by the Glasgow, Paisley, Kilmarnock and Ayr Railway Act 1837 (7 Will. 4 & 1 Vict. c. cxvii), and opened its line to Ayr in 1840. It was a locomotive railway, and in due time it opened its branch line from Dalry to Kilmarnock, with the intention of extending to Carlisle to meet up with whatever railway might reach that city from the south. The GPK&AR had anticipated constructing its authorised line and then the extension, but by 1846 there was a frenzy of competing schemes that threatened to destroy the company's core business. Few of these were realistic, but the GPK&AR itself felt obliged to promote numerous branches, many of them tactical, in order to keep competing schemes out. This period of railway promotion was followed by a slump, when money was difficult to come by, and these factors prevented the GPK&AR from bringing its Carlisle extension into reality.

Enthusiasm for a connection to English railways continued, however, and was intensified by the promotion of other schemes to link central Scotland and England. Interests friendly to the GPK&AR formed the Glasgow, Dumfries and Carlisle Railway (GD&CR) to extend from the southern extremity of the GPK&AR to Carlisle; their route became known as the Nithsdale Route. Opposing promoters put forward a so-called central line via Carstairs and Beattock, that had the advantage of a shorter mileage, and the capacity to serve Edinburgh directly, but the disadvantage of much heavier gradients and running through a less populous area. This route became known as the Annandale Route.

The GD&CR was authorised by an act of Parliament, the Glasgow, Dumfries, and Carlisle Railway Act 1846 (9 & 10 Vict. c. ccclxxii), but the rival Caledonian Railway (CR) had already had authorisation for building its line on the Annandale route; the GD&CR's financial position led it to abandon its intention of building an independent line to Carlisle, and it altered its plan so as to join the CR at Gretna Junction, relying on negotiating running powers for its trains to reach Carlisle.

Glasgow and South Western Railway Incorporation Act 1847
- Act of Parliament
- Parliament of the United Kingdom
- Long title: An Act to amend the Acts and alter the Terms of Amalgamation of the Glasgow, Dumfries, and Carlisle Railway Company, and of the Glasgow, Paisley, Kilmarnock, and Ayr Railway Company.
- Citation: 10 & 11 Vict. c. clxxxiii

Dates
- Royal assent: 9 July 1847

Other legislation
- Repealed by: Glasgow and South Western Railway Consolidation Act 1855

Status: Repealed

Text of statute as originally enacted

The GD&CR and the GPK&AR formed the definite intention of merging; at first the GD&CR demanded terms that were excessive, particularly as their own financial situation was weak: they were funding construction of their line with money loaned by the GPK&AR. However more realistic expectations emerged later, and by the Glasgow, Dumfries, and Carlisle Railway Act 1846 (9 & 10 Vict. c. ccclxxii) and the Glasgow and South Western Railway Incorporation Act 1847 (10 & 11 Vict. c. clxxxiii) it was determined that the two companies would merge when the GD&CR had completed construction of its line. The GPK&AR extended as far as Horsecleugh (between Cumnock and New Cumnock) and the GD&CR reached an end-on junction there, completing the through line on 28 October 1850.

=== The G&SWR formed ===
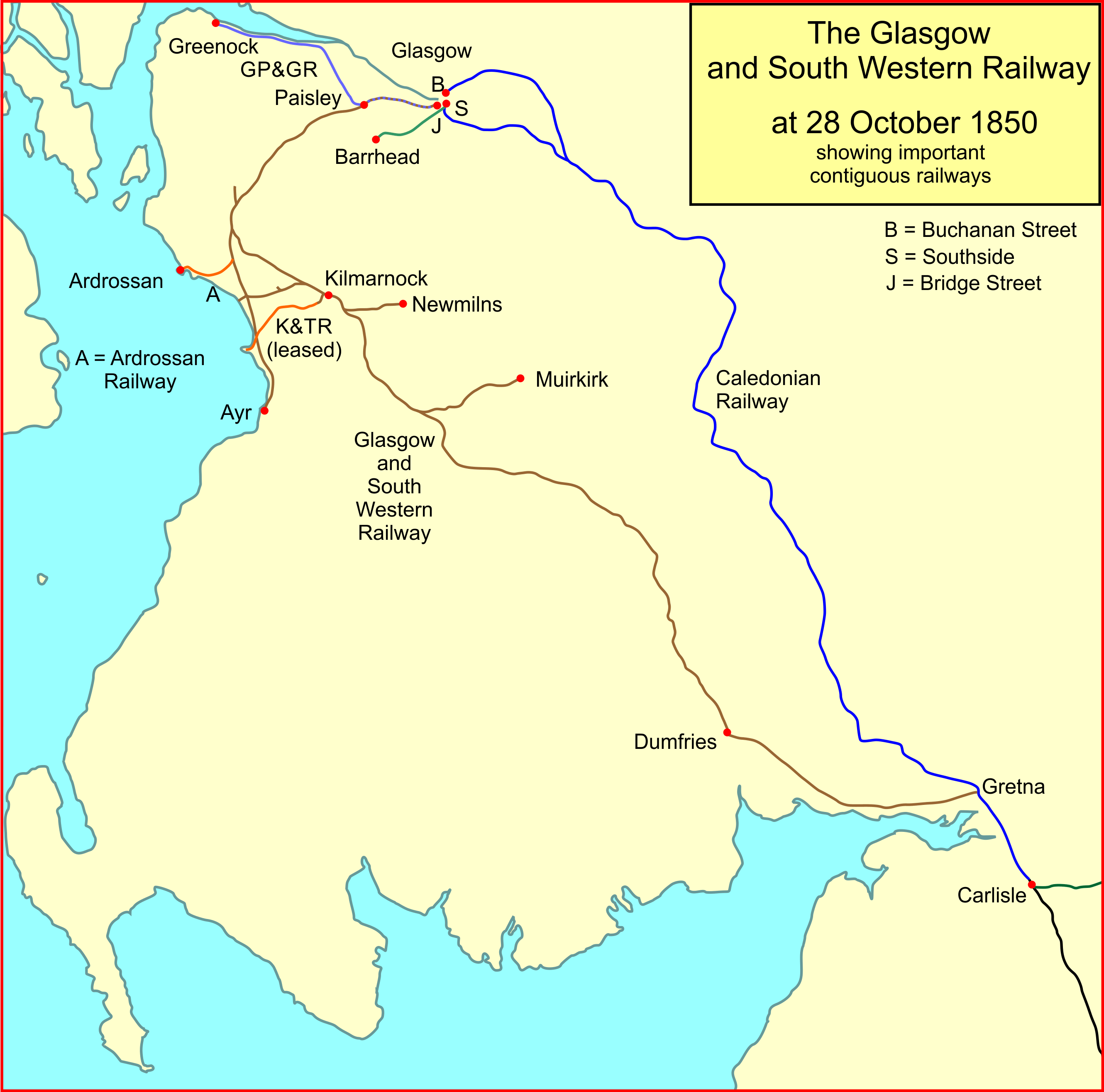
System map of the G&SWR at vesting in 1850

Accordingly on 28 October 1850 the G&SWR was formed. Although this was described as a merger, the reality was that the penniless GD&CR was dissolved, its operation was taken over by the GPK&AR, and the latter company changed its name to the G&SWR. The GPK&AR had been working the GD&CR's line for it since it (partially) opened.

The new company had lines:

- from Bridge Street in Glasgow to Ayr; the Ayr station was north of the river, at Newton-on-Ayr), and the section between Bridge Street and Paisley was owned and operated jointly with the Glasgow, Paisley and Greenock Railway; and
- from Dalry Junction to Gretna Junction via Kilmarnock and Dumfries; and
- a number of lines in mineral districts, including the former Kilmarnock and Troon Railway, now upgraded to contemporary technical standards.

The trains on the Dumfries line now ran through to Carlisle, an arrangement having been made with the Caledonian Railway (CR) to permit this. However the CR did not encourage the G&SWR and only on 1 March 1851 was a booking clerk given accommodation at Carlisle Citadel passenger station. This was granted on an undertaking that the G&SWR would never interfere with the business of the CR or the Lancaster and Carlisle Railway, and tolls were charged for use of the line from Gretna, and for bulk goods passing through Carlisle, whether transshipped or not. The CR ensured that all traffic between south of Carlisle and Glasgow or Edinburgh was routed over its own line.

The accounts for the first half-year, produced in March 1851, showed gross income for the six months to be £87,186 and a 2.25% dividend was declared. The company owned 72 engines, 171 passenger coaches, and 2,416 non-passenger vehicles. Good enough as the results were, the long main line to Gretna was not producing much, due to the dominance of competing route of the Caledonian Railway, and business in general declined following the first half-year. A pooling agreement was finalised in 1853 which mitigated some of the worst toll charges, but routing of goods traffic via the CR was made obligatory in many situations. The agreement included a comprehensive limitation on encroachment by either railway into the other's territory.

=== Expansion by alliance ===
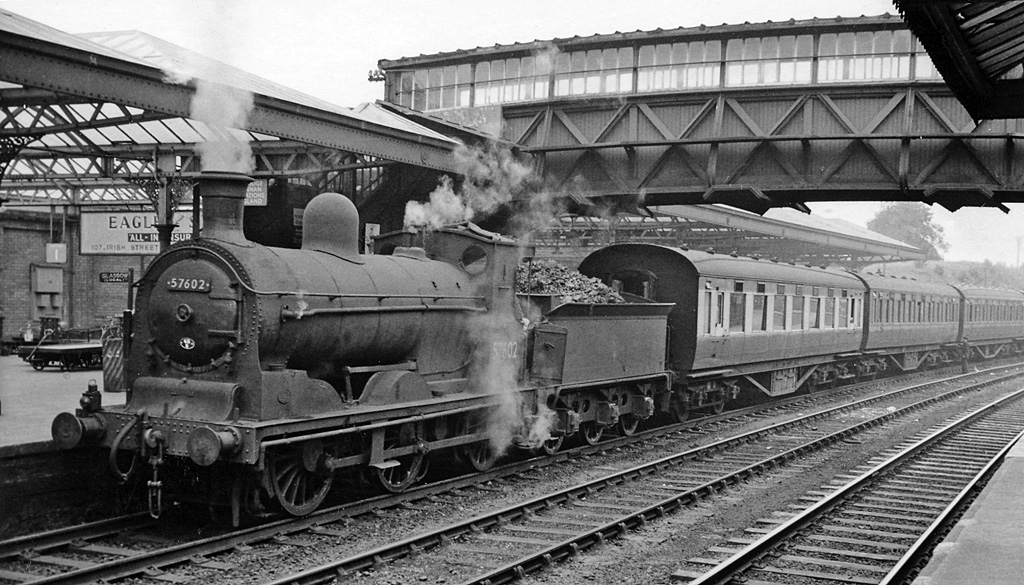
Dumfries station pilot in BR days

In the years immediately following the formation of the G&SWR, the shortage of capital meant that no definite steps were taken for further expansion. Local initiatives were encouraged, however, with the G&SWR providing some funding and in most cases working the line when it was completed.

The Ayr and Dalmellington Railway Act 1853 (16 & 17 Vict. c. cxlviii) was passed on 4 August 1853. At this time the G&SWR Ayr station was north of the River Ayr, and the A&DR was to run from Falkland Junction, a short distance north of the station, and round the east side of the town. The new line had an Ayr passenger station (a temporary structure at first), but it was less convenient than the old terminus; until January 1860 the old G&SWR terminus station continued to be used by some trains. There were important ironworks owned by the Houldsworth family, and ironstone and coal deposits, in the lands near Dalmellington. The independent A&DR company was worked by the G&SWR and later absorbed on 1 August 1858.

On 10 July 1854 the Ayr and Maybole Junction Railway was authorised to reach Maybole by a junction from the Ayr and Dalmellington; the junction was to be called Maybole Junction, but was named Dalrymple Junction when the line opened to goods traffic on 15 May 1856. Passenger opening was delayed until 2 August 1856 because of the Board of Trade inspecting officer's dissatisfaction with the works at first. This line too was worked by the G&SWR.

There were discussions of a further extension railway to reach Girvan and develop the harbour there, possibly as a ferry port for Ireland: a Maybole and Girvan Railway was formed in 1855; it got its authorising act of Parliament, the Maybole and Girvan Railway Act 1856 (19 & 20 Vict. c. xcix), on 14 July 1856. All of these local initiatives received the promise of cash support from the G&SWR. The Maybole and Girvan line opened on 24 May 1860; the old Maybole station, east of Redbrae, was unsuitable for an onward route and was by-passed, the new passenger station being at Culzean Road.

The Ardrossan Railway had long been allied to the G&SWR and by the Ardrossan Railway Transfer Act 1854 (17 & 18 Vict. c. clxxxii) of 24 July 1854 it was vested in the G&SWR, effective on 1 August 1854. The line ran between Ardrossan Harbour and Kilwinning, with mineral branches extending further east.

=== Reaching towards the north of Ireland ===
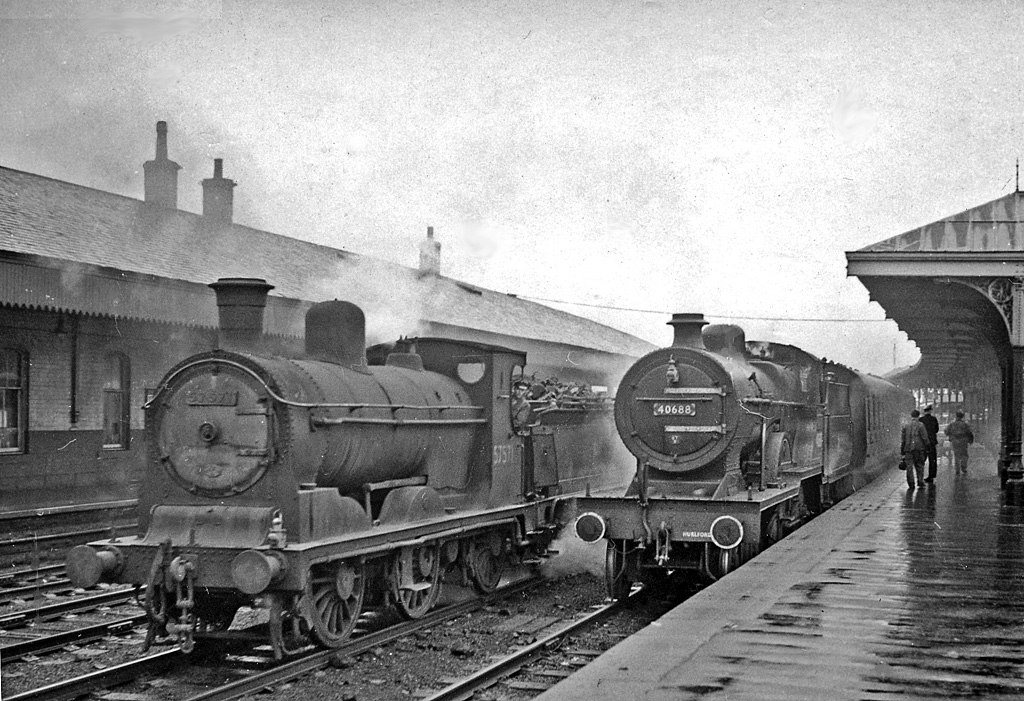
Kilmarnock station in 1957

The wide space of countryside west of Dumfries and south of Girvan still lacked any rail connection. In 1856 a provisional Castle Douglas and Dumfries Railway (CD&DR) was gaining momentum. It was independently sponsored, although it was seen as a possible first step in opening up the entire region; it was authorised on 21 July 1856. This prompted the G&SWR to relocate the Dumfries station to a point north of St Mary's street; the former "temporary" station was relegated to goods status. The new station opened on 13 September 1859: it was described as "equal if not superior in lightness and beauty to any in Great Britain". The CD&DR line opened on 21 July 1856. (Note: The SLS says 7 November.)

For many years schemes had been put forward to reach Portpatrick. There was a small harbour there and ferry crossings to Donaghadee provided the shortest route to reach the north of Ireland. Mail, cattle, and soldiers had been conveyed that way, but reaching Portpatrick with a railway across difficult and sparsely populated land had been a challenge. Encouraged by the CD&DR authorisation, at the end of 1856 promoters resolved to build a British and Irish Grand Junction Railway, 62 miles (100 km) from Castle Douglas. Government assurances were given about the use of the sea route for mail and improvement of the tiny harbour at Portpatrick, and suddenly rival railways including the English Great Northern Railway were hastening to put up money for a share. With a capital of £460,000, the line looked well supported and got its act of Parliament, the Portpatrick Railway Act 1857 (20 & 21 Vict. c. cxlix), on 17 August 1857, retitled the Portpatrick Railway.

The construction, through difficult terrain, went ahead, and as completion became near, the Portpatrick Railway planned the arrangements for the working of its line. The G&SWR were working the CD&DR and offered to work the Portpatrick line for 72% of gross receipts. The G&SWR had recently announced that it worked its own railway for less than 38%, and the Portpatrick line decided the proposed charge was too much; on 28 March 1860 they decided that "the board should retain the working of the line under their own management". The G&SWR had been certain that its terms for working the line would have to be accepted; it had promised a further £40,000 towards the capital cost of the Portpatrick Railway, and on a pretext it now declined to make that payment, further alienating the Portpatrick Railway. The line opened, stoutly independent, on 12 March 1861 as far as Stranraer.

The government had implied a promise to improve the tiny harbour at Portpatrick and was now delaying; the Portpatrick Railway delayed too, but finally completed the line from Stranraer to Portpatrick on 28 August 1862. Although some use was made of the route, the anticipated major sea crossing never materialised, and in time Stranraer became the more important port.

=== The Paisley and Renfrew line ===
Before the existence of the G&SWR, its predecessor, the GPK&AR had acquired the Paisley and Renfrew Railway, a horse-operated railway with track on stone blocks, and the GS&WR acquired this line. By 1866 the primitive technology had become an embarrassment and pressure from the Burgh of Renfrew caused the G&SWR to upgrade the line to locomotive haulage, converting it to standard gauge, and connecting it to the main joint line at Greenlaw, east of Paisley, and facing Glasgow. The work was completed by September 1867 and through passenger trains between Glasgow and Renfrew were instituted.

=== Crossing the Clyde, and a central Glasgow station ===
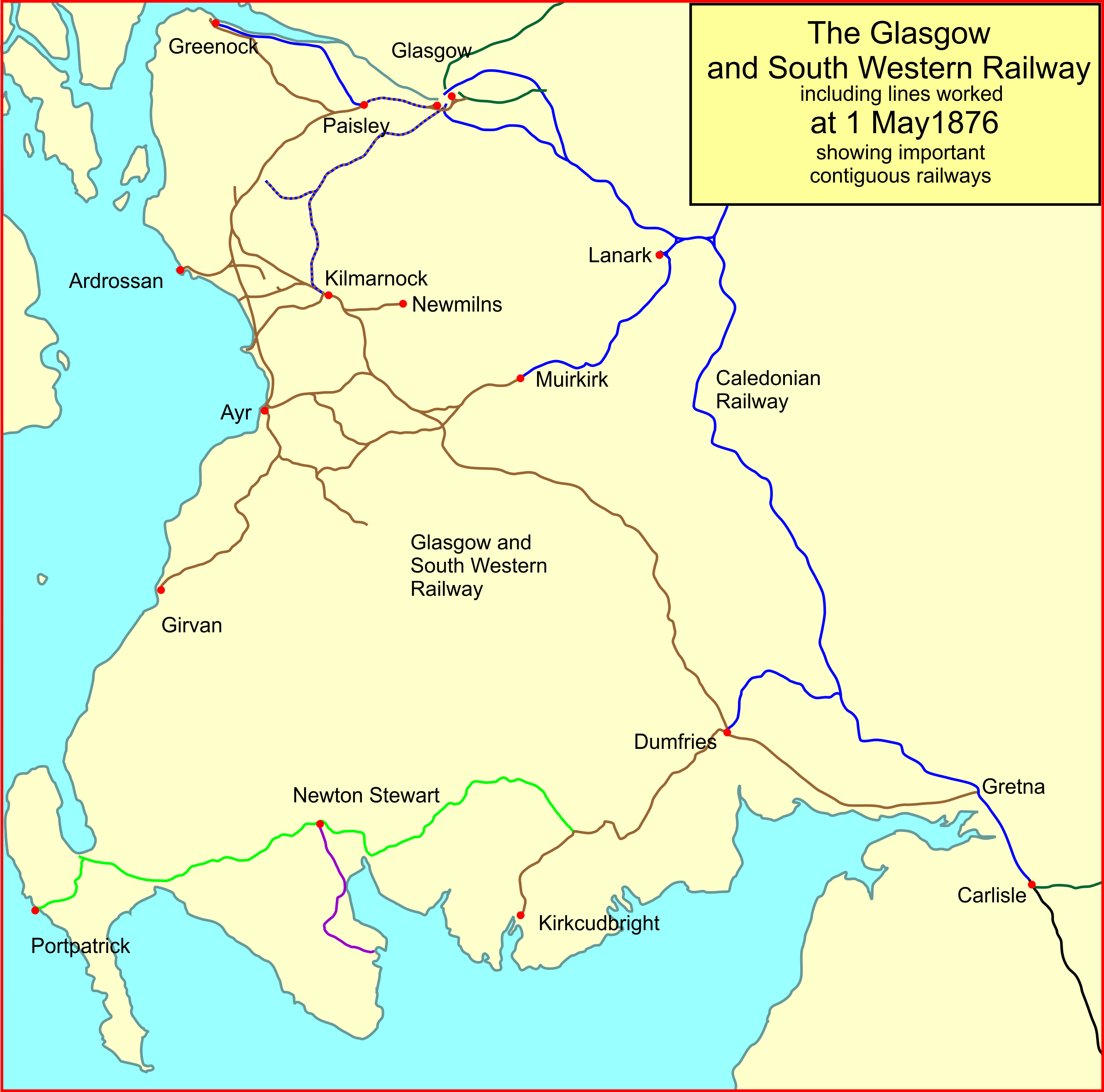
System map of the G&SWR 1876

As traffic increased, dependency on the Bridge Street station as the G&SWR Glasgow station became ever more strained, and a nominally independent central terminus was proposed; this would involve constructive the first railway bridge over this part of the Clyde—there had previously been no connection across the river in Glasgow. The G&SWR and the Edinburgh and Glasgow Railway (E&GR) were partners, and invited the Caledonian Railway (CR) to join in, but the CR declined.

The City of Glasgow Union Railway (CGUR) obtained authorisation in the City of Glasgow Union Railway Act 1864 (27 & 28 Vict. c. cclxxxvi) on 29 July 1864; the capital was £900,000 with the G&SWR and the E&GR taking one-third of the shares each. (The following year the two existing companies agree to take all the stock themselves.) The line would run from a junction with the Paisley joint line at West Street (Note: Later referred to as Eglinton Street Junction, and later still merged with Shields Junction.) to Sighthill on the E&GR, with a new passenger station at St Enoch, a large goods station in land vacated by the University of Glasgow and a connection at West Street to the General Terminus goods branch on the bank of the Clyde.

Construction was slow and costs overran heavily; on 12 December 1870 the first trains ran from Shields Road to a temporary central passenger terminus at Dunlop Street. On 1 June 1871 the line was extended to Bellgrove, joining the North British Railway (NBR) there, and forming the north–south connecting link, which was heavily used for transfer goods trains.

It was not until 1 May 1876 that St Enoch station opened and through trains to London ran from there. The station was universally regarded as magnificent, and in 1879 the accompanying St Enoch Hotel, the largest in Scotland, opened too. By now the NBR enthusiasm for a general central passenger station had waned, and the northwards exit from St Enoch station was only used by local G&SWR trains to Springburn. On 29 June 1883 the station and the immediate approach lines were transferred from the CGUR to the G&SWR.

This was followed by partition of the CGUR; the section south and west of College Junction (near High Street, NBR) went to the G&SWR, and the section north and east of Bellgrove went to the NBR. These changes were enacted on 29 June 1883.

Glasgow and South Western Railway Act 1898
- Act of Parliament
- Parliament of the United Kingdom
- Long title: An Act for conferring further powers on the Glasgow and South Western Railway Company for the construction of works and the acquisition of lands and for other purposes.
- Citation: 61 & 62 Vict. c. clix

Dates
- Royal assent: 25 July 1898

Text of statute as originally enacted

In the 1890s it became obvious that expansion of St Enoch was essential, and on 18 August 1898 the Glasgow and South Western Railway Act 1898 (61 & 62 Vict. c. clix) for the extension of St Enoch station was passed. A second arch roof and six further platforms were built; they were brought into use progressively from 1901. The extension was completed in 1904, at a cost of £2.5 million.

=== A direct line to Kilmarnock ===
Glasgow and South-western Railway (Kilmarnock Direct) Act 1865
- Act of Parliament
- Parliament of the United Kingdom
- Long title: An Act to enable the Glasgow and South-western Railway Company to make new Railways between Kilmarnock and Glasgow, and for other Purposes.
- Citation: 28 & 29 Vict. c. lxxiv

Dates
- Royal assent: 2 June 1865

Text of statute as originally enacted

The GPK&AR had declined to give Kilmarnock a direct route; it opened its line via Dalry in 1843. In 1848 the Glasgow, Barrhead and Neilston Direct Railway (GB&NDR) opened from a South Side terminus in Glasgow. The line was friendly to the Caledonian Railway. In 1865 both the Caledonian Railway and the G&SWR obtained acts of Parliament, the Crofthead and Kilmarnock Extension Railway Act 1865 (28 & 29 Vict. c. cxxxix) and the Glasgow and South-western Railway (Kilmarnock Direct) Act 1865 (28 & 29 Vict. c. lxxiv), giving them authority to build lines from Glasgow to Kilmarnock. Shareholders of both companies objected to the wasteful duplication, and the Caledonian and Glasgow and South Western Railways (Kilmarnock Joint Line) Act 1869 (32 & 33 Vict. c. xcviii) was obtained for the Glasgow, Barrhead and Kilmarnock Joint Railway (GB&KJR), owned jointly by both companies, running from Neilston on the GB&NDR. It opened in 1873, with a branch from Lugton to Beith. A connection into the St Enoch line was opened shortly afterwards.

=== Other new lines proposed, and existing branches absorbed ===
As well as supporting the City Union line, in 1864 the G&SWR proposed a large number of branch lines, most of them tactical in respect of competition with the Caledonian Railway. This caused considerable disquiet among shareholders—the same was true within the Caledonian company—and some moderation of the proposals took place. As part of the rapprochement, the G&SWR was granted permanent powers to run between Gretna and Carlisle, for £5,000 a year.

Glasgow and South-western Railway (Amalgamations) Act 1865
- Act of Parliament
- Parliament of the United Kingdom
- Long title: An Act for the Amalgamation of divers Railway Companies with the Glasgow and South-western Railway Company; and for other Purposes.
- Citation: 28 & 29 Vict. c. ccxcviii

Dates
- Royal assent: 5 July 1865

Text of statute as originally enacted

Under the Glasgow and South-western Railway (Amalgamations) Act 1865 (28 & 29 Vict. c. ccxcviii), four railways were absorbed, effective from 1 August; they were the Bridge of Weir Railway (from Elderslie, opened in 1864), the Maybole and Girvan Railway (described above; it had never made money and had run out of cash to finish the buildings and ancillary works on the line); the Castle Douglas and Dumfries Railway (CD&DR); and the Kirkcudbright Railway. The CD&DR and the Kirkcudbright Railway were now operated as the Kirkcudbright branch as a single unit from Dumfries. The Caledonian Railway was granted running powers between Dumfries and Castle Douglas for trains it ran between Lockerbie and Stranraer.

=== Reaching Greenock ===
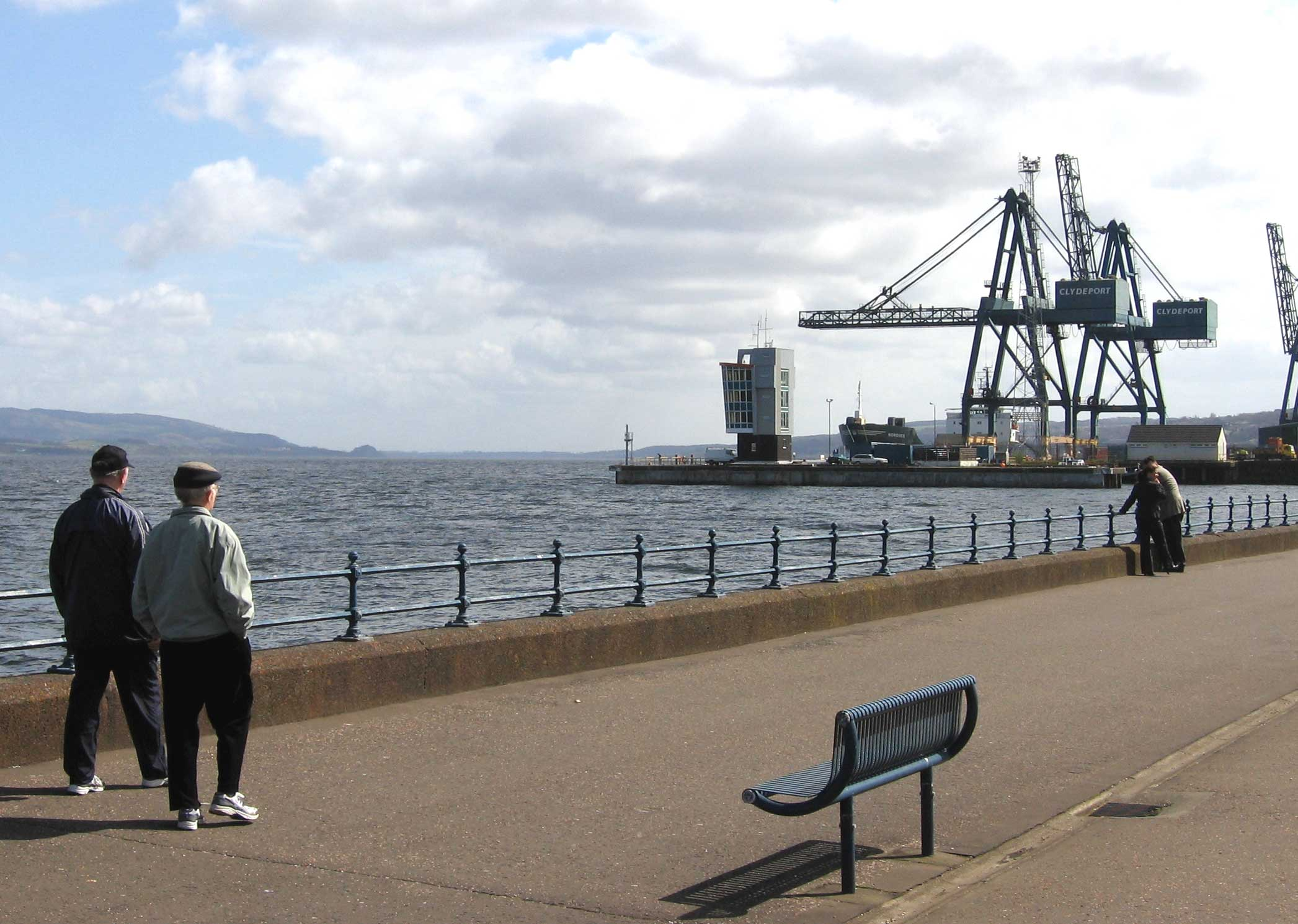
The Prince's Pier, Greenock, in use today as a shipping terminus

From the outset, Greenock had been served by the Glasgow, Paisley and Greenock Railway, allied to the Caledonian Railway. The port developed and carried increasing volumes of goods, and passenger traffic for the Clyde ferries grew considerably. The G&SWR wished to secure a share of this valuable traffic, and the Bridge of Weir Railway had been a move in that direction. The friendly Greenock and Ayrshire Railway (G&AR) was heavily supported (£300,000 out of £350,000 share capital) by the G&SWR, and opened its line from Bridge of Weir to its Albert Harbour station at Greenock, in 1869. This gave a quayside transfer to steamers at Greenock, and a price war with the established CR line broke out, eventually resolved with a traffic sharing agreement: the G&SWR received 42.68% of receipts.

In 1872 the G&AR was absorbed by the G&SWR. The Greenock Harbour Trustees further developed Albert Harbour, constructing Princes Pier with extensive berthing facilities for steamers, and the G&SWR renamed their own station Princes Pier in 1875.

Further extension to the harbour facilities took place at the eastern side of Greenock, at Garvel. The G&SWR built a connecting line eastwards from Lynedoch, opening on 5 August 1886. G&SWR trains had to reverse twice to reach the harbour on a steep incline. The branch cost £262,467.

=== The Annbank lines ===
In 1870 and the following years, a network of lines was opened connecting Ayr with mineral-bearing districts in east Ayrshire. The first line was from Ayr to Mauchline through Annbank, and this was followed by a long loop from Annbank to Cronberry on the Muirkirk line, and a connection to Holehouse Junction on the Dalmellington route. Although the Mauchline connection facilitated some passenger journeys, mineral traffic was more important than passenger operation on these lines.

=== Extending to Largs ===
Ardrossan had long been reached, but the G&SWR wished to extend up the coast to Largs. It experienced resistance at first, the Largs Branch opened in stages between 1878 and 1885, with stations at West Kilbride, Fairlie and Largs.

A Fairlie Pier station was opened: the station roof was built using materials recovered from the temporary Dunlop Street station. Bitter and destructive competition for the ferry traffic to island locations developed.

=== Portpatrick again—or Stranraer ===
The G&SWR had reached Girvan in 1860 with the help of allied local companies. Continuing from Girvan to Portpatrick, for the crossing to the north of Ireland was still an aspiration, but this section was the most difficult, and sparsely populated terrain. After some false starts, friendly promoters put forward a Girvan and Portpatrick Junction Railway (G&PJR) obtained the Girvan and Portpatrick Junction Railway Act 1865 (28 & 29 Vict. c. ccclviii) on 5 July 1865 to close the gap. Raising money, and carrying out the construction was much more difficult than expected. The railway was to reach Stranraer by joining the Portpatrick Railway at Challoch Junction, continuing over that line for 10 miles (16 km). However the Portpatrick line was being worked by the Caledonian Railway (CR), and the CR was hostile to the G&PJR, which it saw was an ally of the G&SWR.

It took until 5 October 1877 to inaugurate a full passenger service over the line. In the intervening period the supposed advantages of Portpatrick as the ferry port for the north of Ireland had dissipated, and Stranraer was now considered the better port. The G&PJR was financially exhausted and weak, operating a long main line with little local business. The financial situation worsened and the company was taken over by the Ayrshire and Wigtownshire Railway Company (A&WR) on 1 August 1887. The new ownership appears to have been a speculative move, but the A&WR was no more solvent than its predecessor. In 1892 the G&SWR purchased the company for £270,000 (on 20 June). It introduced corridor coaching stock was on the boat trains in 1899.

The Portpatrick Railway (PR) had its established line from Dumfries to Stranraer, also a long line through difficult terrain with little intermediate business, but achieving significantly better financial results. The arrangement with the CR for that company to work the line expired in 1885 and the PR considered who might take up the work. Both the CR and the G&SWR were candidates, and two English railways, the London and North Western Railway (LNWR) and the Midland Railway (MR) were interested in extending their influence to Stranraer to capture Irish business.

The Wigtownshire Railway was in effect a branch of the PR, running south from Newton Stewart to connect good quality farming land around Wigtown and the sea ports of Garlieston and Wigtown. Their line was being worked by an independent contractor, Thomas Wheatley and his son.

After considerable negotiation, the decision emerged not to form a further working arrangement for the PR, but instead to merge the PR and the Wigtownshire Railway. The combined network formed the Portpatrick and Wigtownshire Joint Railway, purchased by a consortium of the interested larger companies, the G&SWR, the CR, the Midland Railway and the London and North Western Railway. The arrangement was ratified on 6 August 1885; the sale value was £491,980. The line was worked by the G&SWR and the CR in tandem.

=== Paisley Canal, and the Dalry and North Johnstone line ===
Glasgow and South-Western Railway Act 1881
- Act of Parliament
- Parliament of the United Kingdom
- Long title: An Act for conferring further powers on the Glasgow and South-western Railway Company for the construction of Works, the acquisition of Lands, and the raising of Money; for authorising the discontinuance of the Paisley Canal; and for other purposes.
- Citation: 44 & 45 Vict. c. cxlix

Dates
- Royal assent: 18 July 1881

Text of statute as originally enacted

As traffic developed, especially the mix of heavy mineral traffic and passenger trains, line capacity became increasingly a problem. This was particularly the case on the Glasgow and Paisley Joint Line where the traffic of the rival Caledonian Railway had to be dealt with. In 1881 the G&SWR submitted a parliamentary bill to drain the defunct Glasgow, Paisley and Johnstone Canal and build a railway on it. The bill passed as the Glasgow and South-Western Railway Act 1881 (44 & 45 Vict. c. cxlix), and the G&SWR started work on what became the Paisley Canal Line. The new line left the former City of Glasgow Union Line at Shields Junction, where it joined the Joint Line, and ran via the southern part of Paisley to Elderslie, where it rejoined the Ayr main line. At this time Paisley was enjoying very considerable industrial growth and the new line was able to serve the relevant areas.

Following the route of a contour canal involved many meandering curves, the worst of which were eased by the use of earthworks. The line opened fully on 1 July 1885, and some through passenger trains used the line as well as local and mineral trains. Capitalising on access to industry in Paisley, a spur off the Canal Line to Potterhill was opened in 1886.

In 1894–5, new carriage sidings were constructed at Bellahouston on the Canal Line, while new engine sheds at Corkerhill were constructed, to relieve pressure on the city centre accommodation.

Industry was expanding too in Johnstone, on the north side of the town in areas not served by the main line. As well as mineral extractive industries, there were extensive textile mills along the Black Cart Water, and a short branch line from Cart Junction to Johnstone North was opened in 1896.

The traffic congestion problem was also experienced on the main line between Elderslie and Dalry (where the Kilmarnock line diverged) and the decision was taken to duplicate this section of the route by a new line on the north of the lochs in the Garnock Valley. The scheme upgraded the Johnstone North line, and ran from its terminus (upgraded and relocated) to Brownhill Junction, north of Dalry, by way of Lochwinnoch. This was the Dalry and North Johnstone Line, which opened in 1905. The capacity relief was continued at Dalry by quadrupling the track from Brownhill Junction, and the junction itself was a flying junction, the first in Scotland.

Much more traffic took the diverging route at Elderslie towards Cart Junction—all of the new line traffic, as well as the fast Greenock boat trains—and the opportunity was taken to provide a burrowing junction at Elderslie for this route: when the Ayr main line was built, it crossed the canal by a bridge. The canal was long defunct, and a new line was built passing under the bridge and running to Cart Junction, eliminating the conflicting move. This opened in 1906.

=== Darvel ===
In 1896 the Newmilns branch was extended to Darvel. When the Caledonian Railway (CR) reached the town from the east in 1905, a non-encroachment agreement was activated and a few miles of line from Darvel to the Lanarkshire county boundary was transferred from the CR to the G&SWR. There was an end-on connection at the county line.

The volume of mineral traffic heading for Troon and Ayr caused congestion in passing through Kilmarnock station, and a by-pass line on the south side of the town opened in 1902. These developments are described in the article Cross-country lines of the Glasgow and South Western Railway.

=== Linking Paisley and Barrhead ===
Observing the success of the Paisley Canal and Potterhill lines in serving industry, both the CR and the G&SWR considered lines in the area between Paisley and Barrhead. In 1902 the G&SWR opened the Barrhead Branch from Potterhill to a new Barrhead Central station, with spurs to the GB&KJR route. For a time a circular passenger service was operated from St Enoch via Paisley Canal, Potterhill and Barrhead Central. Usage proved disappointing, and it reverted to a reduced conventional service in 1907, and Barrhead Central closed to passengers in 1917.

=== Three local lines after 1900 ===
The small industrial town of Catrine had long aspired to a railway connection. Possibly responding to a petition, the G&SWR built a short branch from Brackenhill Junction, south of Mauchline. The Catrine branch opened on 1 September 1903, with a train service operated by a railmotor.

In 1905 the Cairn Valley Light Railway opened, connecting Moniaive with the G&SWR main line just north of Dumfries. It adopted a proprietary signalling system based on Sykes lock and block system. Passenger usage was poor and was hit hard by bus competition, and the line closed to passengers in 1943.

On 17 May 1906 the Maidens and Dunure Light Railway opened. Intended to open up remote coastal settlements between Ayr and Girvan it was promoted with the construction of the luxurious Turnberry Hotel. Through trains from Glasgow were run, and in both World Wars military use was made of the line. Local passenger services were discontinued in 1930, but the link at the Girvan end to Turnberry survived for a short period; at the Ayr end a holiday camp was in use, receiving holidaymakers by train to Heads of Ayr until 1968.

== Operations ==
=== Brakes ===
In the earliest days, railways did not have continuous brakes (in which brakes on all or most vehicles in a train could be controlled by the driver). Over the course of time, accidents created pressure for their provision on passenger trains, but the system to be adopted was controversial.

At first the company adopted Smith's simple vacuum brake, but although the equipment was simple, it had the defect that it was inoperable in the event of a train becoming divided, or if the engine apparatus failed. The company decided to change systems: at the end of 1878 the Board of Trade were informed that the G&SWR had six engines operating Smith's brake, and 22 engines operating the Westinghouse brake. The Westinghouse system was much more complicated, but it was an automatic brake.

In this period there was considerable disparity in the systems used on the railways of the country, and compatibility between locomotive and the vehicles of another company, for example on through trains, was a serious issue. The company began to see its future as an ally of the Midland Railway, a large English system using the automatic vacuum brake, and in 1884 decided to convert to that system. There was a lengthy transition period during which compatibility with other companies' rolling stock was a problem.

By the end of 1900 the company had 210 engines fitted with continuous brake equipment, and 97% of passenger mileage was under such conditions. 2,021,266 train miles (3,252,912 km) were run with the automatic vacuum brake, and 69,160 train miles (111,302 km) with Westinghouse.

=== Slip coach ===
Between 1888 and 1901 the G&SWR operated a slip coach service. The slip coach section was slipped at Irvine off the 4.15 pm St Enoch to Ayr, which ran non-stop from Paisley to Prestwick. The slip section was attached to an Ardrossan to Ayr stopping train, with which it followed the main train. Six-wheel brake vans with end windows were built for the service.

== Signalling ==
Swan (1999), writing for the Glasgow and South Western Railway Association, described early concentration of signalling and primitive interlocking at Dumfries:

In 1859 the Castle Douglas and Dumfries Railway formed a junction at Dumfries, and at the request of the G&SWR built a brick "lighthouse" or octagonal signalbox at Albany Junction. It opened with two wooden masts built into the castellated telegraph hut, the tallest for running up and down a flag to signify if the main line north to St Enoch was clear and the second one slightly shorter to signal the trains for the Castle Douglas branch.

With the opening of the Lockerbie branch into Dumfries in 1863 the pointsman's tower was removed from the junction beyond Albany Place and was re-erected on the summit of the slope at the deep cutting north of Dumfries station. The Castle Douglas and Lockerbie railways formed junctions with the G&SWR line in the cutting opposite the pointsman's tower.

The Kirkcudbright Advertizer [sic] further reported: The points at the sidings and junctions will be worked from the top of this bank by means of rods and levers. Three semaphore signal posts have been erected at the tower; the central post, which is higher than the others, is for the G&SWR line; that on the eastern side, for the Lockerbie line; and the one on the western side, for the Castle Douglas line. The semaphores for each line will be connected with the levers which work the points, and consequently when the pointsman shifts the points the semaphore is made by the same movement to show the proper signal … In the night the signals will be by lamp lighted with wax lights.

== Shipping ==
Serving many piers and harbours on the Firth of Clyde it was natural that the G&SWR developed shipping services to the islands and other piers. This traffic increased considerably in the 1870s and excursion traffic also became significant.

== Closures ==
In the 1960s consideration was given to rationalising the railway facilities in Glasgow, and it was decided to concentrate the south-facing passenger services on Glasgow Central station, closing St Enoch. The closure took place in 1966, and for some time the trainshed was used principally as a car park; the roof was demolished in 1975. The site was redeveloped as the St Enoch Centre, which was opened in May 1989.

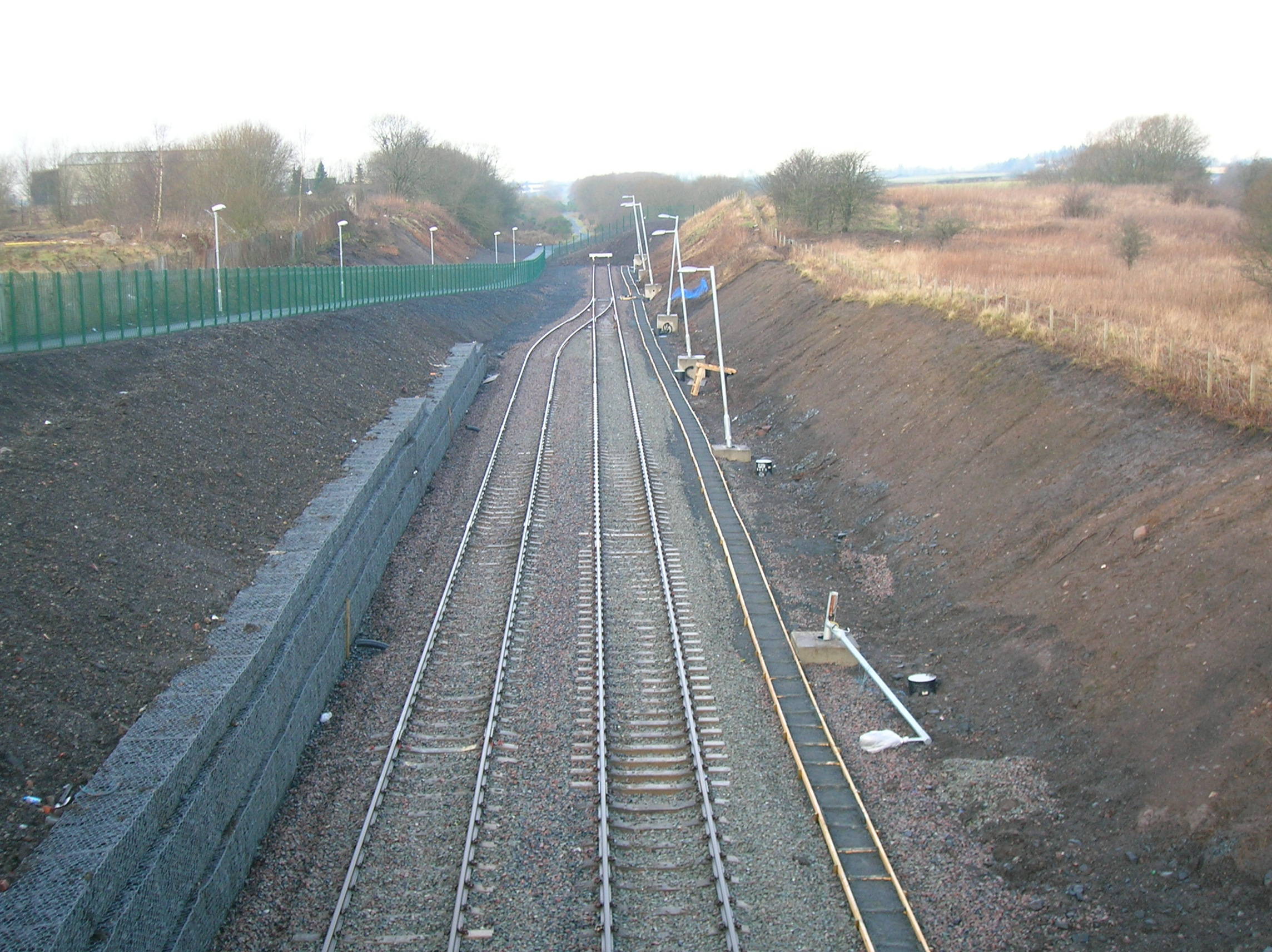
A stub of the G&SWR route relaid at Kilmarnock for coal traffic in 2010

The Greenock line was shortened to operate only between Elderslie and Kilmacolm in 1966. In 1971 the Princes Pier stub was connected to the Wemyss Bay line at Cartsburn Junction in order to serve the Clyde Port Authority container terminal.

In June 1965 the Port Road between Dumfries and Challoch Junction was closed; Stranraer boat trains were diverted via Mauchline. In 1966 local services were withdrawn from the Dalry to Kilmarnock line; the route closed completely in October 1973 after completion of the West Coast Main Line electrification.

The Paisley Canal Line was closed in January 1983, and the original Paisley Canal station, on the east side of Causeyside Street, was converted into a restaurant. In the 1980s and 1990s the course of the line beyond Paisley was made into a footpath and cycle path. This links Lady Octavia Park in Greenock, through upper Port Glasgow, Kilmacolm and past Quarrier's Village to Paisley. It is part of the Sustrans National Cycle Route linking Edinburgh and Gourock.

== The G&SWR network today ==
The main line of the G&SWR, from Glasgow to Carlisle via Kilmarnock and Dumfries continues to operate at the present day. The line from Glasgow to Stranraer via Ayr also continues in use, together with the branch from Kilwinning to Largs. After a period of closure the Paisley Canal line reopened, operating only between Shields Junction and Paisley Canal. Passenger services are supported by the Strathclyde Partnership for Transport.

== Key people ==
=== Chairmen ===
- Sir Andrew Orr 1849-1871
- Sir James Lumsden 1871-1879
- Peter Clouston 1879-1883
- Sir Matthew William Thompson, 1st Baronet 1883-1891
- Sir William Renny Watson 1891-1900
- Patrick T. Caird 1900-1915 (deputy chairman 1897-1900)
- Sir James Bell, 1st Baronet 1915-1920
- Matthew Arthur, 1st Baron Glenarthur 1920-1922

=== General Managers ===
- William Johnstone 1840-1874
- W.J. Wainwright 1874-1886
- John Morton 1886-1892
- Thomas Brunton 1892-1894
- David Cooper 1894-1922

=== Locomotive Superintendents ===
- Patrick Stirling 1853-1866
- James Stirling 1866-1878
- Hugh Smellie 1878-1890
- James Manson 1890-1911
- Peter Drummond 1912-1918
- Robert Harben Whitelegg 1919-1922

== See also ==
- Locomotives of the Glasgow and South Western Railway

== Sources ==
- Awdry, Christopher (1990). Encyclopaedia of British Railway Companies. Sparkford: Patrick Stephens Ltd. ISBN 1-8526-0049-7. OCLC 19514063. CN 8983.
- Robertson, C. J. A. (1983). The Origins of the Scottish Railway System: 1722-1844 (1st ed.). Edinburgh: John Donald Publishers Ltd. ISBN 0-8597-6088-X.
- The Railway Year Book: 1912. London: Railway Publishing Company. OCLC 12305143.
- Thomas, John (1971). A Regional History of the Railways of Great Britain. Vol. VI Scotland: The Lowlands and the Borders (1st ed.). Newton Abbot, Devon: David & Charles. ISBN 0-7153-5408-6. OCLC 16198685.
- Thomas, John; Paterson, Rev A. J. S. (1984). A Regional History of the Railways of Great Britain. Vol. VI Scotland: The Lowlands and the Borders (2nd ed.). Newton Abbott, Devon: David & Charles. ISBN 0-9465-3712-7. OCLC 12521072.
- The Glasgow & South Western Railway Association
