= List of gravity hills =

List of optical illusions that appear to violate gravity

A gravity hill is a place where a slight downhill slope appears to be an uphill slope due to the layout of the surrounding land, creating the optical illusion that water flows uphill or that a car left out of gear will roll uphill. Many of these sites have no specific name and are often called just "Gravity Hill", "Magnetic Hill", "Magic Road" or something similar.

== Argentina ==
- Buenos Aires Province: El camino misterioso, just outside Tandil.
  coordinates: 37°20′21.60″S 59°5′12.60″W
- Chubut: On ruta provincial 12, connecting Gualjaina to Esquel.
  coordinates: 42°44′25″S 70°47′36″W
- Jujuy: Locality Las Lajitas, on ruta provincial 56, between La Mendieta and Carahunco.
  coordinates: 24°21′15.70″S 65°1′31″W

== Armenia ==
- Aragatsotn Province: On the road to Lake Kari, on Mount Aragats.
  coordinates: 40°26′10″N 44°13′40.50″E

== Australia ==
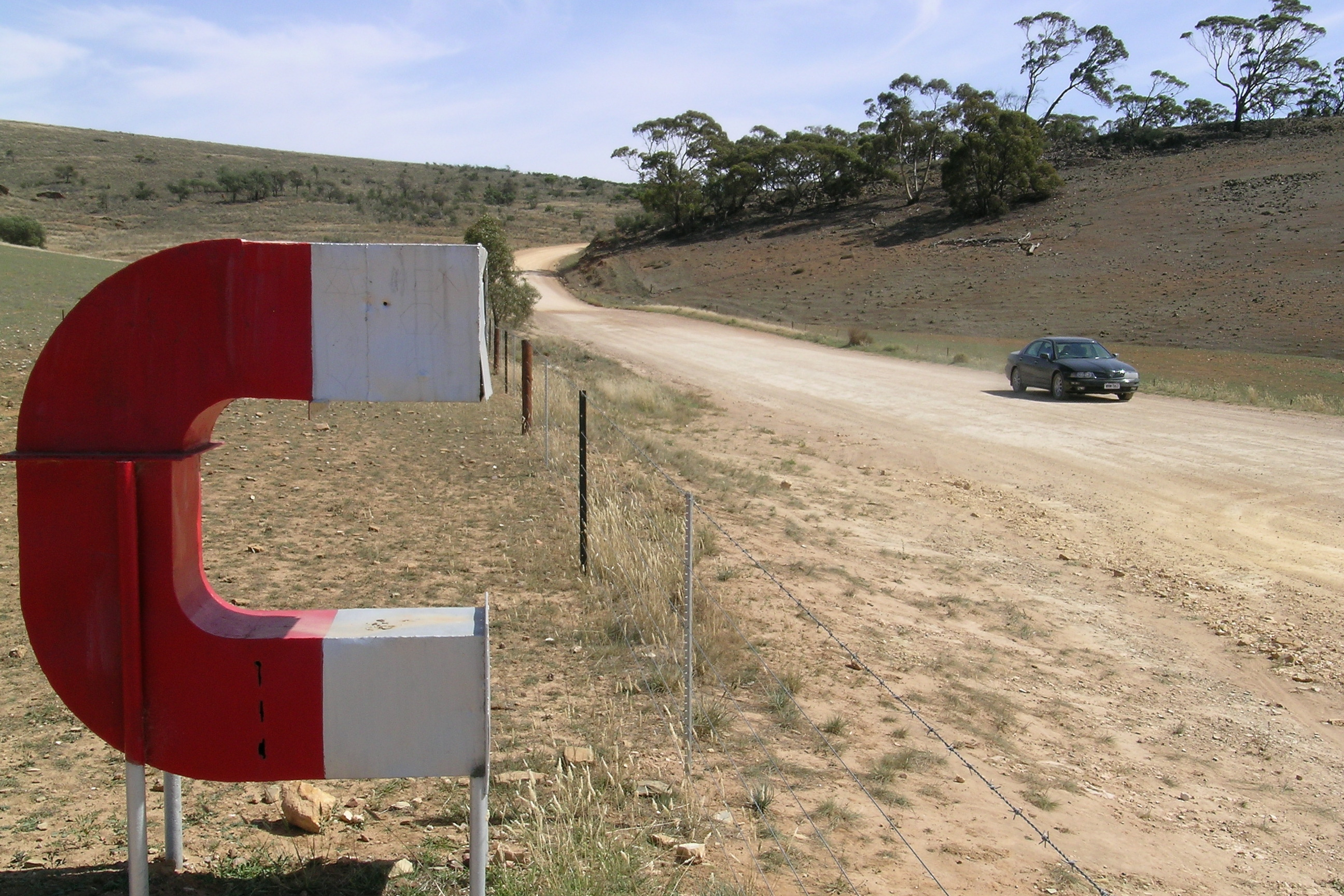
Magnetic Hill in Orroroo, South Australia

- Bowen Mountain, in Bowen Mountain, New South Wales: Bowen Mountain Road, shortly after turnoff from Grose Vale Road. Known as Magnetic Mountain. Hill starts at intersection of Bowen Mountain Road and Westbury Road
  coordinates: 33°34′20″S 150°38′37.70″E
- Forrestfield, Western Australia: Holmes Road, There is a right hand bend about 300 metres (yards) north of Whistlepipe Ct, then a gradual left hand bend. The location is between these two bends.
  coordinates: 31°58′38.20″S 116°1′40″E
- Moonbi, New South Wales, near Tamworth: "Gravity Hill" near the Moonbi lookout
  coordinates: 30°58′22.80″S 151°6′18″E
- Orroroo, South Australia: Magnetic Hill, on the road from Black Rock to Pekina
  coordinates: 32°51′55.70″S 138°37′31″E
- Woodend, Hanging Rock, Victoria: Straws Lane
  coordinates: 37°21′22″S 144°36′23.20″E
- Brisbane, Queensland: Spook Hill, on Mount View Road.
  coordinates: 27°36′53″S 153°13′7.70″E

== Azerbaijan ==
- Goygol District: Between Ganja and Goygol Lake.

== Barbados ==
- Gravity hill at Morgan Lewis, Saint Andrew.
  coordinates: 13°16′21″N 59°34′40″W

== Belize ==
- "Magnetic Hill" on the Hummingbird Highway.
  coordinates: 17°3′48″N 88°35′23″W

== Brazil ==
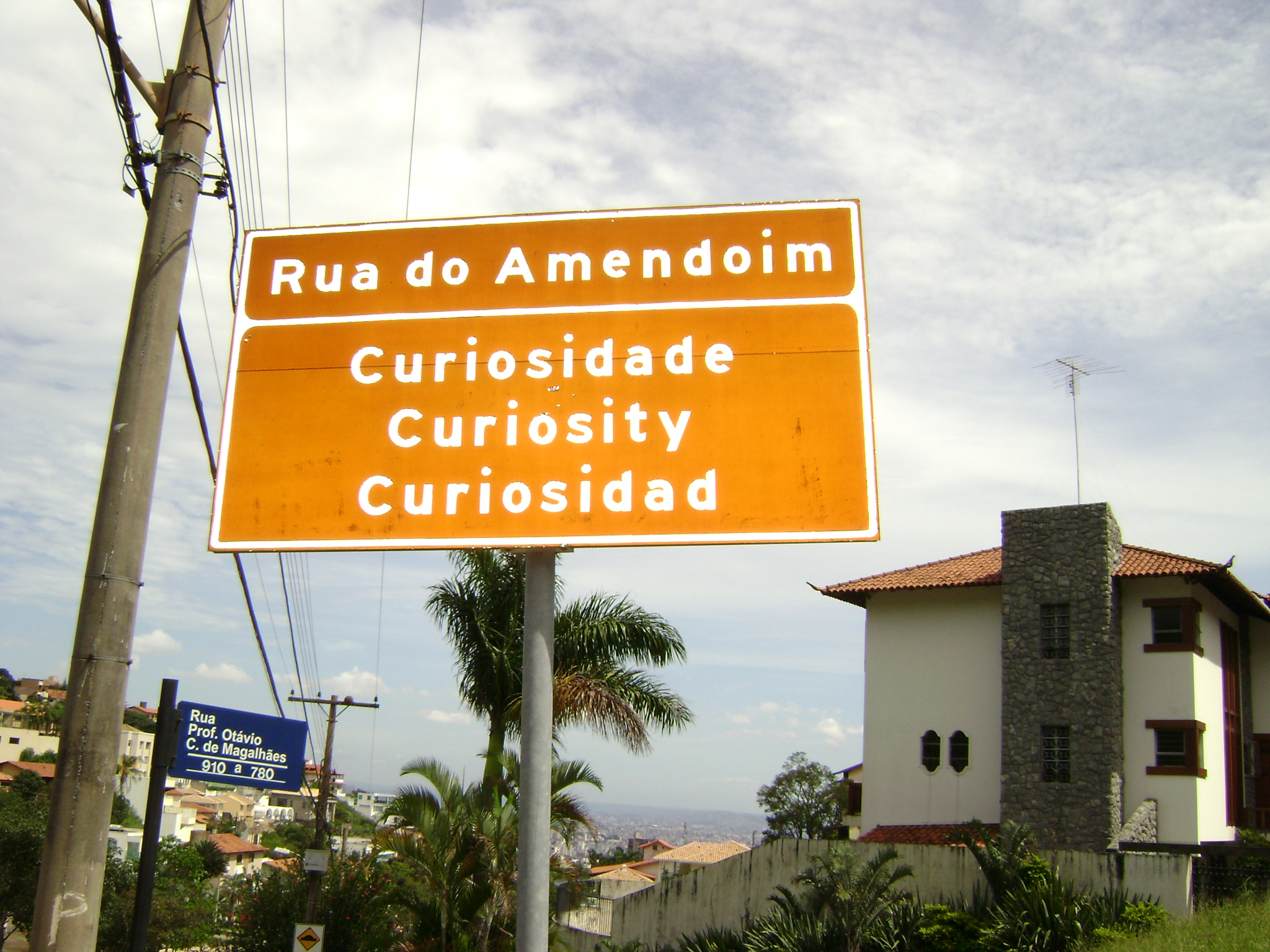
Sign for Rua do Amendoim, in Belo Horizonte, Brazil

- Mato Grosso: On the MT-251 road between Cuiabá and Chapada Dos Guimarães.
  coordinates: 15°22′4.8″S 55°50′42″W
- Belo Horizonte, Minas Gerais: Rua Professor Otávio Coelho de Magalhães (official name), popularly known as Rua do Amendoim (Portuguese for "Peanut Street").
  coordinates: 19°57′13.86″S 43°54′54.22″W
- São Thomé das Letras, Minas Gerais: Ladeira do Amendoim.
  coordinates: 21°42′21″S 44°59′0.50″W
- Paraíba: On the BR-110, near Teixeira.
  coordinates: 7°12′39″S 37°16′13″W
- Exu, Pernambuco: "Ladeira da Gameleira" on the BR-122 federal highway segment connecting Exu to Crato.
  coordinates: 7°25′50″S 39°45′17.2″W
- Rio de Janeiro: Locality of Belvedere, near Petrópolis.
  coordinates: 22°33′17″S 43°14′10″W
- Rio Grande do Norte: On the BR-226 federal highway segment between Jucurutu and Florânia
  coordinates: 6°6′57.4″S 36°54′27″W
- Santa Catarina: On the SC-110, between Bom Retiro and Urubici.
  coordinates: 27°53′36″S 49°34′39″W

== Canada ==
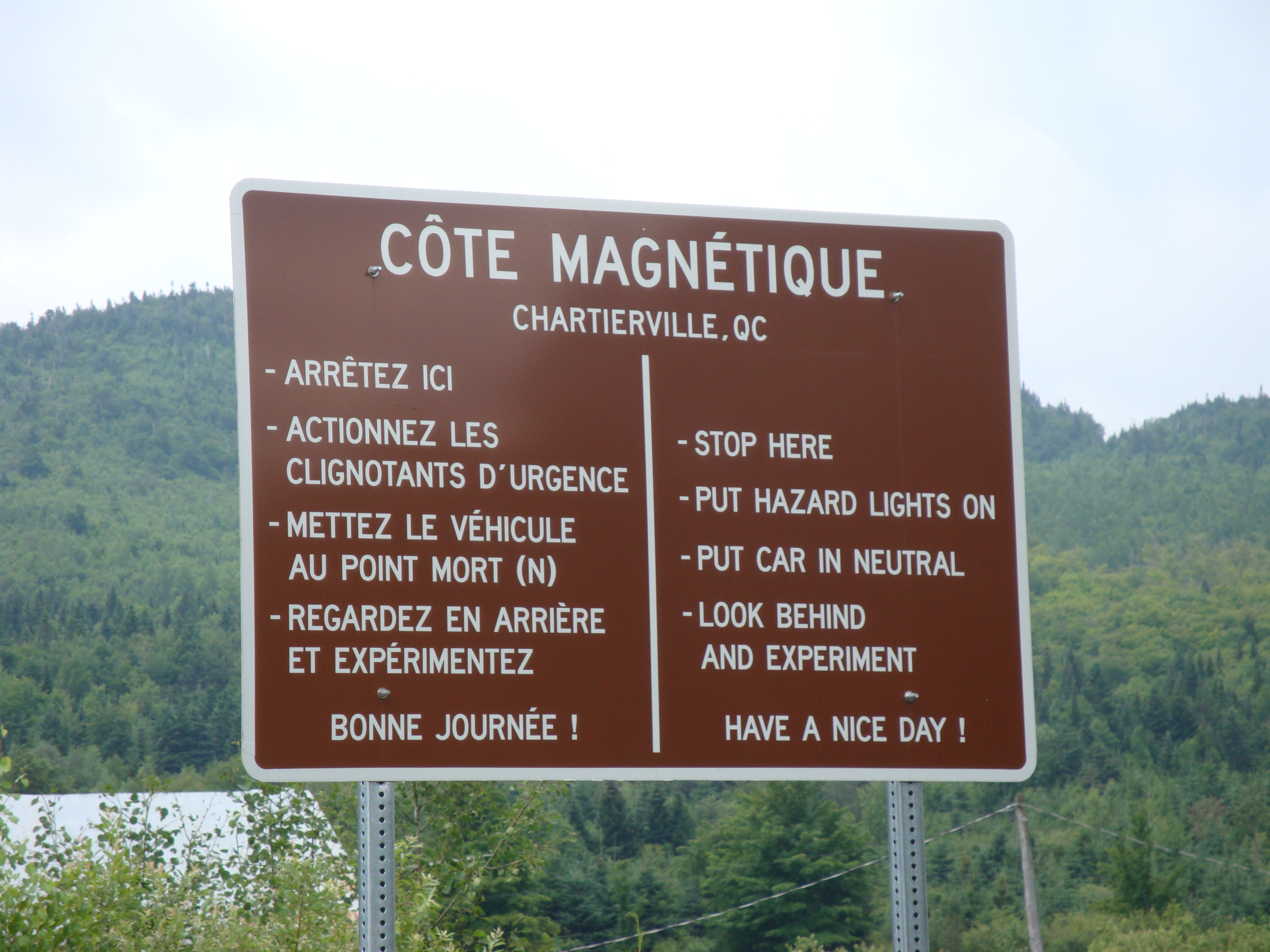
Magnetic Hill in Chartierville, Quebec

- Abbotsford, British Columbia: McKee Road just before Ledgeview Golf Course
- Whonnock, Maple Ridge, British Columbia: Just south of 100th Avenue on 256th Street.
  coordinates: 49°11′0.70″N 122°30′45.8″W
- Vernon, British Columbia: 5390 Dixon Dam Road.
  coordinates: 50°17′3.60″N 119°12′43″W
- Benito, Manitoba: "Magnet Hill". Heading west after leaving P.R. No. 487 towards the Thunder Hill Ski Area, an apparent dip in the road provides the illusion.
  coordinates: 52°1′37.60″N 101°34′51″W
- Moncton, New Brunswick: Magnetic Hill. One of the most well-known gravity hills worldwide.
  coordinates: 46°8′12″N 64°53′25″W
- Bridgetown, Nova Scotia: on Hampton Mountain Road 2 km (1.2 mi) south of Valleyview Provincial Park
- Burlington, Ontario: King Road, just north of Bayview Park. Stop car at "No Motorized Vehicles" sign, face south.
  coordinates: 43°20′13″N 79°51′42″W
- Caledon, Ontario: Escarpment Sideroad just off Highway 10, at Escarpment's intersection with the street leading to Devil's Pulpit Golf Course.
  coordinates: 43°50′24″N 79°58′4″W
- Dacre, Ontario: near the intersection of Highway 41, near intersection with Highway 132, known as Magnetic Hill
  coordinates: 45°21′27.5″N 77°0′48.8″W
- Sparta, Ontario: "Magnetic hill", on Centennial Road.
  coordinates: 42°42′50″N 81°8′53.80″W
- Oshawa, Ontario: Ritson Road N (north of Raglan Road).
  coordinates: 44°2′3.7″N 78°54′55.7″W
- Chartierville, Quebec: Magnetic Hill.
  coordinates: 45°15′54.6″N 71°12′19.3″W
- Notre-Dame-Auxiliatrice-de-Buckland, Quebec: Route Saint-Louis (Côte magnétique de Buckland)
  coordinates: 46°36′1.3″N 70°32′17.8″W

== Chile ==
- Arica y Parinacota Region, Arica Province: Zona magnética, on ruta 11 (the Arica-Putre road).
  coordinates: 18°27′12.30″S 69°45′50.60″W
- Easter Island (Rapa Nui, Isla de Pascua), Valparaíso Region: Punto magnético, near Anakena beach.
  coordinates: 27°4′58.80″S 109°19′3″W
- Valparaíso Region: Arbol magnético or Algarrobo magnético, on the road connecting the town of Jahuel to the Termas de Jahuel Spa. The location is marked by a large Prosopis tree growing beside the road.
  coordinates: 32°41′26.30″S 70°36′6″W

== China ==
- Liaoning: The Strange Slope (or Magic Slope): an 80 metres (87 yards) long slope in Guaipo Resort, about 30 km (19 mi) to the north-east of the city of Shenyang.
  coordinates: 42°3′55″N 123°38′1″E
- Liaoning: a 76 m (250 ft) slope near Liujia Wopeng Village, Huludao City.

== Costa Rica ==
- Alajuela Province: La cuesta magnética, on the Bijagua-Upala road.
  coordinates: 10°46′23.70″N 85°1′46″W

== Cyprus ==
- Paphos: Just after Droushia exit to Polis main road.
  coordinates: 34°58′58.6″N 32°24′21.6″E

== Czech Republic ==
- Close to the village of Kačerov near Zdobnice.
  coordinates: 50°14′12.60″N 16°22′27.40″E
- On the road leading from Moravská Třebová to the village of Hřebeč, at the point where it branches off from route 35.
  coordinates: 49°45′7.8″N 16°35′49.50″E

== Denmark ==
- Bornholm: Magnetbakken.
  coordinates: 55°11′13.1″N 14°58′30″E

== Dominican Republic ==
- Polo: El Polo Magnético ("The Magnetic Pole")
  coordinates: 18°9′44″N 71°15′18″W

== El Salvador ==
- Sonsonate Department: On the CA 8W (Ruta de las flores), in Salcoatitan.
  coordinates: 13°50′5.5″N 89°45′45.5″W

== France ==
- Curiosité de Lauriole, Hérault, on a small road linking the D56 to the hamlet "Les Fournes", between Minerve and Siran, through Fauzan.
  coordinates: 43°20′53.10″N 2°40′16.70″E
- Route magique des Noës, Loire department, Auvergne-Rhône-Alpes Region: Starting from Renaison go in the direction of Les Noës, continue for about 1 km (1000 yards) to the hamlet "Les Forges", and then turn left.
  coordinates: 46°2′19.60″N 3°50′9″E
- La montée qui descend, Côte-d'Or Department, Bourgogne-Franche-Comté Region, near the village of Savigny-lès-Beaune.
  coordinates: 47°3′32″N 4°48′47″E
- Rhône department, Auvergne-Rhône-Alpes Region, on the D43 road between La Poyebade and Odenas.
  coordinates: 46°5′53″N 4°38′29″E

== Georgia ==
- "Magic hill" in Tbilisi.
  coordinates: 41°41′10.30″N 44°45′48.40″E

== Germany ==
- On the L3053 between Butzbach and Hausen-Oes.
  coordinates: 50°25′18.70″N 8°38′12.70″E
- Essen-Werden, North Rhine-Westphalia: On the three-way intersection of Klemensborn and Pastoratsberg roads, on the road part leading to the DJH Youth Hostel, starting just across the road from the public bus stop.
  coordinates: 51°22′53″N 7°0′20″E

== Greece ==
- Karya-Leptokarya road near Leivithra, mount Olympus, Pieria, Central Macedonia.
  coordinates: 40°2′6.50″N 22°31′1″E
- Proti village (altitude 310 metres; 1,020 ft) - Analipseos ("Ascension") Monastery (altitude 930 metres; 3,050 ft) road, mount Pangaion, Serres, Central Macedonia. The spot where the effect starts is marked by signs painted on the road surface. This is a most convincing site: for a distance of about 40 meters (yards), the uphill-going road changes inclination to become very slightly downhill, before it becomes uphill again. Within this stretch of the road, the car will move slowly (which adds to the spookiness of the situation) on its own, and then it will come to a halt. What makes the site more striking than others is that the general direction of the spontaneous movement is clearly towards the higher ground, that is, towards the ascending slope of the mountain and the monastery.
  coordinates: 40°56′10″N 24°2′20.40″E
- Just after the exit of a small tunnel, near Veroia, Imathia regional unit, Central Macedonia. Caution is advised, as, due to possible traffic exiting the tunnel, this is a somewhat risky spot to stop the car at, in order to experience the effect.
  coordinates: 40°30′14″N 22°11′6″E
- Penteli-Agios Petros-Nea Makri road, mount Penteli, North Athens.
  coordinates: 38°3′56″N 23°54′1.20″E
- On the Kalamata-Areopoli provincial road, Messinia regional unit, Peloponnisos.
  coordinates: 36°45′55″N 22°20′17″E
- Island of Kythira. On the road to the monastery of Myrtidiotissa. Before the descent.

== Guatemala ==
- Sololá Department: Paso Misterioso, on ruta nacional 11, just outside the town of Santa Cruz Quixayá, in the direction of San Lucas Tolimán.
  coordinates: 14°32′23″N 91°7′44″W

== Honduras ==
- Comayagua Department: City of Comayagua, on Calle El Volcan, one mile east of Eagle's Nest Bilingual School.
- Yoro Department: On the CA-13 highway, just outside the town of Toyós.
  coordinates: 15°33′12.50″N 87°38′48″W

== India ==
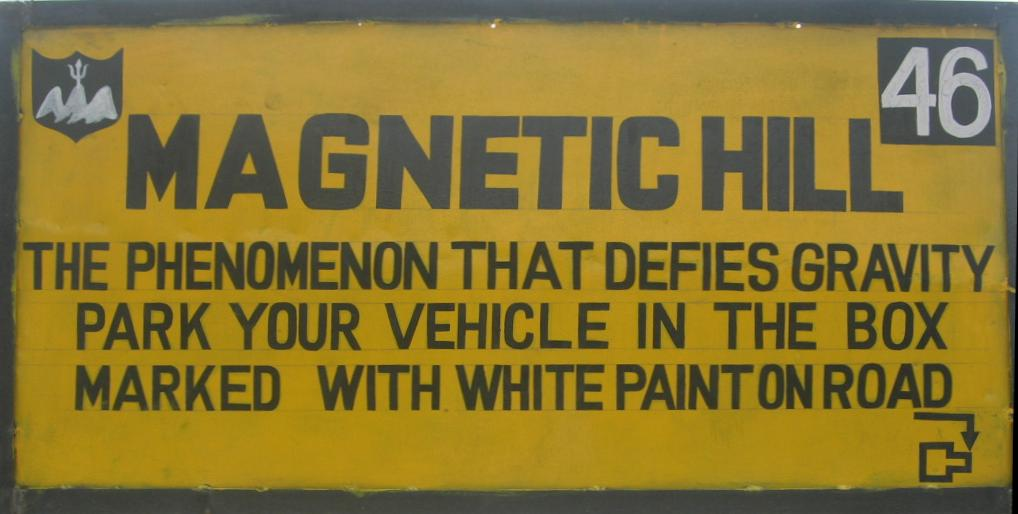
A Border Roads Organisation Himank sign near the Magnetic Hill in Ladakh, India

- Chhattisgarh state:
  - Surguja district - Ulta Pani magnetic hill: also called Bisar paani magnetic hill, is located at Mainpat hill station 70 km (43 mi) south of Ambikapur city.
    coordinates: 22°52′40″N 83°16′53.70″E
- Chhattisgarh state:
  - Kabirdham district - Dewanpatpar magnetic hill: is 40 km (25 mi) north of Pandariya on State Highway SH5 in Kabirdham district (formerly Kawardha district).
    coordinates: 22°28′13.2″N 81°22′41.30″E
- Gujarat state:
  - Amreli district - Tulsishyam Anti Gravity Hill: 400 meters (yards) north of Tulsi Shyam Temple and 75 km (47 mi) south of Amreli city.
    coordinates: 21°3′14.90″N 71°1′30.90″E
  - Kutch district - Kalo Dungar magnetic hill: has a gravity hill optical illusion 5.2 km (3¼ miles) west of the Kutch Dattaterya Temple and 33 km (21 mi) northwest of Kutch city.
- Ladakh union territory:
  - Leh district - Leh-Manali Magnetic Hill: is located 7.5 km (4¾ miles) southwest of Nimmoo on Leh on Manali-Leh highway.
    coordinates: 34°10′15.50″N 77°21′9.50″E
- Maharashtra state:
  - Mumbai - Magnetic L&T flyover: it is an optical illusion on the Jogeshwari–Vikhroli Link Road (JVLR).
    coordinates: 19°7′29″N 72°53′44.50″E

== Indonesia ==
- Kelud mountain, Kediri Regency, East Java.
  coordinates: 7°56′13″S 112°16′19.60″E
- Limpakuwus, Banyumas Regency, Central Java.
  coordinates: 7°18′26″S 109°14′45.30″E
- Aceh Besar Regency, Sumatra.
  coordinates: 5°31′55″N 95°29′25″E

== Iraq ==
- Koy Sanjaq: On the drive toward Hotel Koya Palace.
  coordinates: 36°5′29″N 44°39′38″E

== Ireland ==
- County Louth: Cooley Peninsula, Jenkinstown, east of Dundalk, known locally as Magic Hill.
  coordinates: 54°1′19.60″N 6°17′32″W
- County Sligo: Ballintrillick
  coordinates: 54°22′18.30″N 8°23′38.3″W
- County Tipperary: Slievenamon, overlooking Carrick-on-Suir and near Clonmel
- County Waterford: Comeragh Mountains, on the road to the Mahon Falls
  coordinates: 52°12′58.20″N 7°31′51″W

== Isle of Man ==
- Between Ronague and the Round Table, called Magnetic Hill.
  coordinates: 54°7′45″N 4°41′29″W

== Israel ==
- Near Amuka, Northern District.
  coordinates: 32°59′58.5″N 35°32′10.5″E
- Jabel Mukaber, Jerusalem: The Enchanted Road.

== Italy ==
- Campania: Stradina Magica: a very small and narrow side road in Sala Consilina, Salerno province.
  coordinates: 40°23′43.50″N 15°35′21″E
- Rome (Lazio): between Ariccia and Rocca di Papa on the strada regionale 218, called "Ariccia's downhill".
  coordinates: 41°44′21.50″N 12°41′49.50″E
- Piedmont (Piemonte): Salita di Roccabruna, on the three-way intersection of strada provinciale 122 with the road leading to Sant' Anna. The road to the left appears as downhill although it is uphill.
  coordinates: 44°29′10″N 7°19′23.40″E
- Trentino: The "mirage" slope in Montagnaga, again on a three-way intersection.
  coordinates: 46°6′11″N 11°14′11.2″E
- Abruzzo: Village of Rosciolo dei Marsi near Avezzano, on the road leading to the church of Santa Maria in Valle Porclaneta.
  coordinates: 42°7′35.7″N 13°20′30.5″E
- Apulia (Puglia): On a small side road beside strada statale 172, between Taranto and Martina Franca.
  coordinates: 40°37′14″N 17°19′0.40″E
- Apulia (Puglia): On strada provinciale 39 between Corato and Poggiorsini.
  coordinates: 41°0′20″N 16°21′34″E
- Sicily (Sicilia): Near the town of Santa Maria di Licodia, north of Paternò.
  coordinates: 37°36′32″N 14°52′43.50″E
- Tuscany (Toscana): Between Filattiera and Caprio.
  coordinates: 44°20′47.20″N 9°56′2.50″E
- Umbria: On the San Gemini Nord exit from strada statale 3 bis.
  coordinates: 42°37′7.9″N 12°33′13.1″E

== Japan ==
- Shikoku: Yashima Drive Way on Mt. Yashima, Takamatsu.
  coordinates: 34°21′22″N 134°6′27.50″E
- A three-way intersection near Tōwa, Iwate Prefecture, where both roads are downhill but the right one appears as uphill.
  coordinates: 39°23′15.40″N 141°16′50.30″E
- A three-way intersection near the town of Minamitane, Tanegashima island, Kagoshima prefecture.
  coordinates: 30°24′40″N 130°54′54.80″E
- "Ghost slope" in Kume-Jima, Okinawa Prefecture.
  coordinates: 26°22′21.90″N 126°45′10.90″E
- "Ghost slope" in Okagaki, Fukuoka Prefecture.

== Jordan ==
- Οn the road between Mount Nebo and the Dead Sea.
  coordinates: 31°45′22.8″N 35°41′24.8″E

== Kenya ==
- Machakos County: Kituluni Hill, also known as Kyamwilu, 12 kilometres (7.5 miles) from Machakos town along the Machakos-Kangundo road.
  coordinates: 1°25′34.40″S 37°14′24.30″E

== Lebanon ==
- Road near Hamat.
  coordinates: 34°17′21.50″N 35°42′18.80″E

== Libya ==
- Jafara district, near the town of Alriyayna الـريـايـنة. Location: 32°00'45.6"N 12°19'43.7"E

== Lithuania ==
- Auxiliary road to Kruonis Pumped Storage Plant
  coordinates: 54°47′36″N 24°16′2.50″E

== Malaysia ==
- Sabah: Kimanis–Keningau Highway, about 28 km (17 mi) from Keningau.
  coordinates: 5°27′48.50″N 116°1′15.20″E

== Mexico ==
- Baja California: On an interchange on the Tijuana-Ensenada scenic highway.
  coordinates: 32°0′9.50″N 116°50′6.50″W
- Chihuahua: On CHIH 42, just outside Santa Eulalia.
  coordinates: 28°35′8″N 105°53′51″W
- Colima: Zona mágica, between Comala and Suchitlán.
  coordinates: 19°21′42″N 103°43′26.20″W
- León, Guanajuato. On Cima del Sol Street, just when one enters from Campestre Boulevard.
  coordinates: 21°9′9.80″N 101°42′53.60″W
- Puebla: Punto Marconi, between Metepec and Atlimeyaya.
  coordinates: 18°57′39.70″N 98°28′42.50″W
- Veracruz: Just outside Acultzingo, on the road leading to Tehuacan.
  coordinates: 18°42′55.40″N 97°19′19.70″W
- Veracruz: On the Santana-Los Atlixcos-Topilito road.
  coordinates: 19°51′2.40″N 96°31′5.50″W

== Moldova ==
- Orhei: an area near the M2 highway.
  coordinates: 47°19′21″N 28°48′50″E

== Oman ==
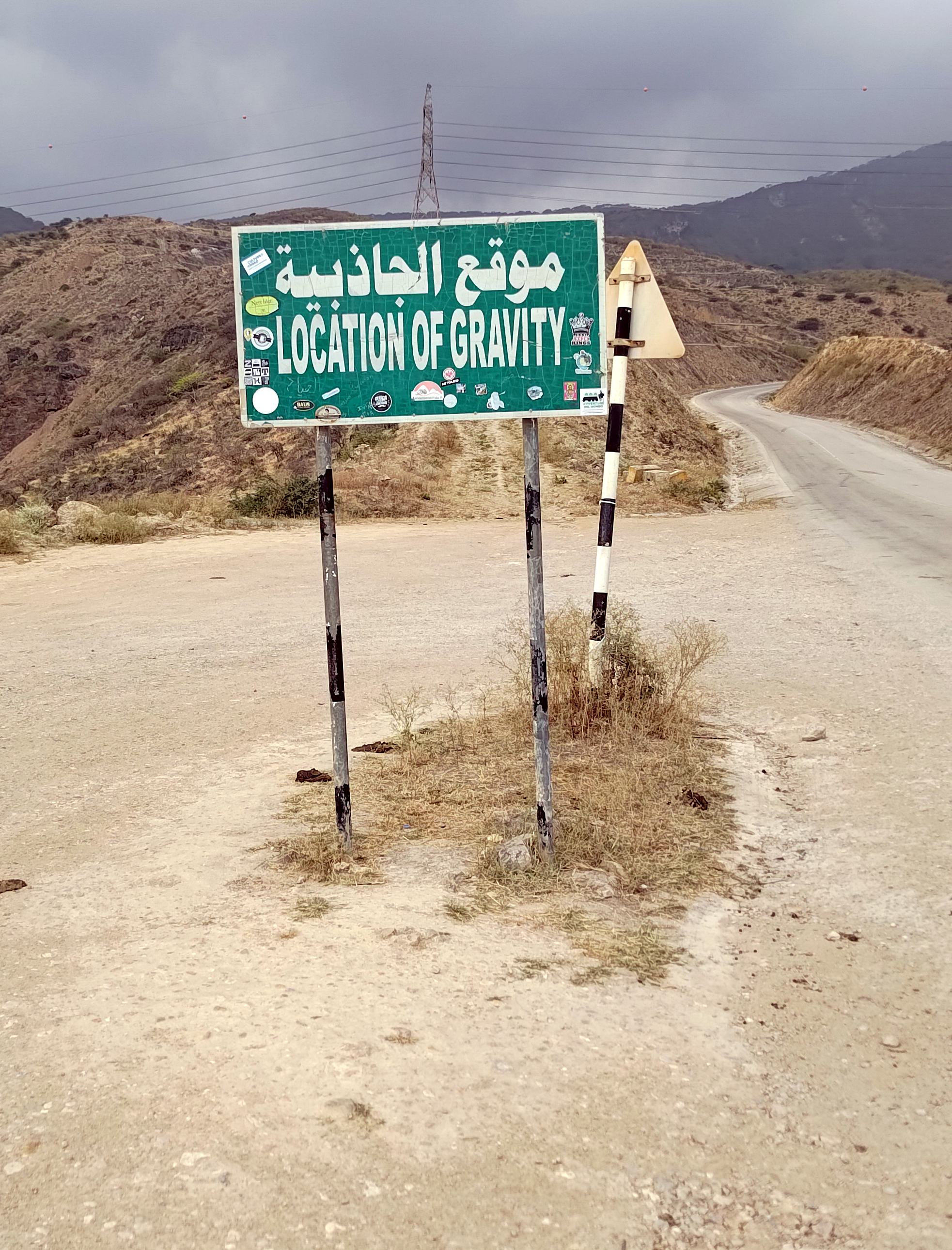
Gravity hill near Salalah, Oman

- Salalah: Anti-Gravity Point
  coordinates: 17°2′28″N 54°36′46″E

== Panama ==
- Volcán, Chiriquí road connecting Volcán with Cerro Punta
  coordinates: 8°47′56.80″N 82°37′30.60″W

== Philippines ==
- Ternate, Cavite, Luzon island: On the Nasugbu-Ternate highway.
  coordinates: 14°14′18.7″N 120°39′52″E
- Los Baños, Laguna, Luzon island: Mount Makiling, Jamboree road.
  coordinates: 14°9′50.7″N 121°13′15″E
- Negros Island: On the Bacolod-San Carlos road, between Murcia and Don Salvador Benedicto.
  coordinates: 10°34′30″N 123°9′53.60″E

== Poland ==
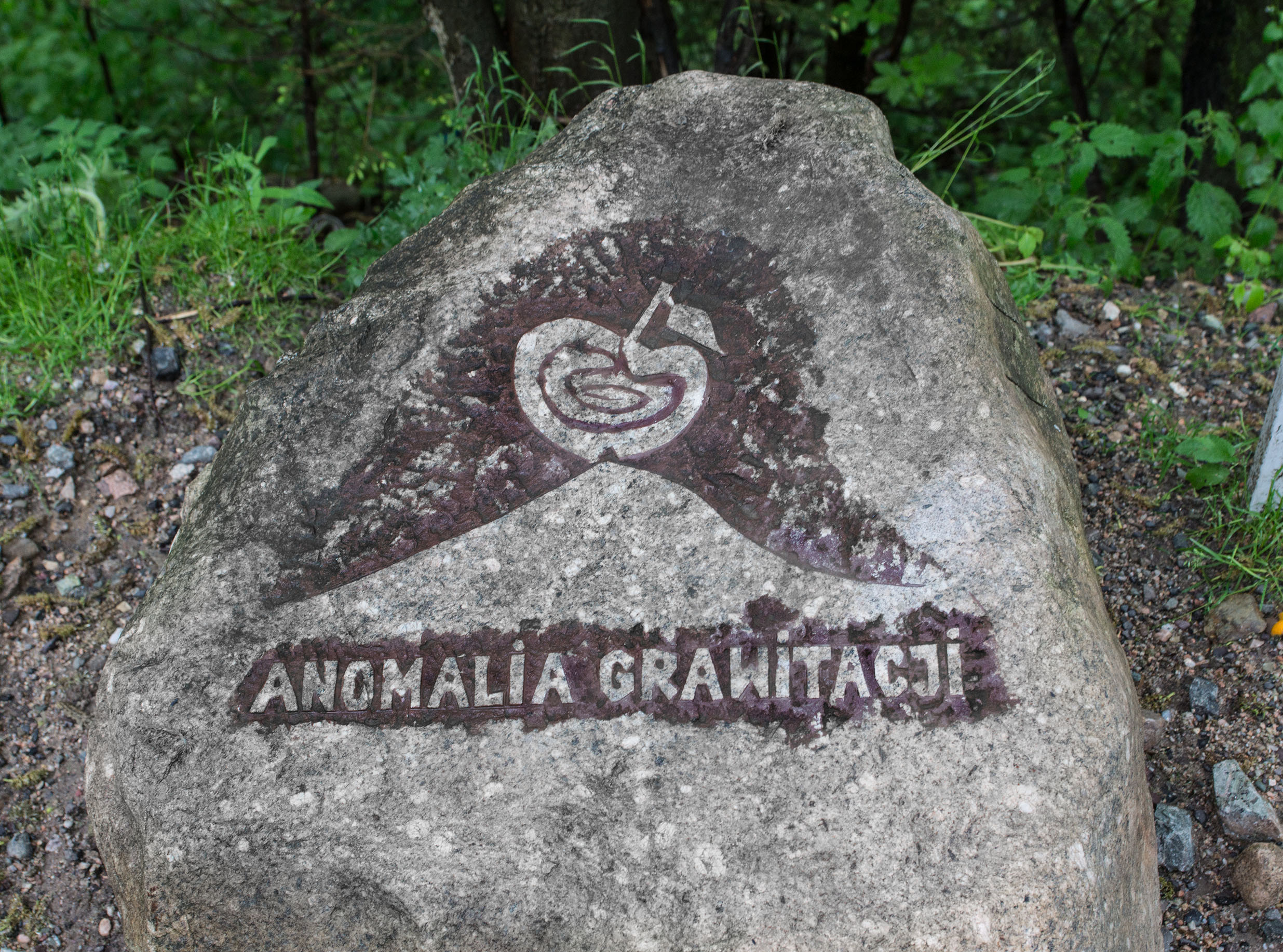
A stone marking location of the "gravitational anomaly" in Karpacz, Poland

- Karpacz, a small town in the Sudetes mountains in south-western Poland, a section of Strażacka Street; the illusion is referred to as a "gravitational anomaly" (Polish: anomalia grawitacji) and is a local tourist attraction.
  coordinates: 50°46′13.7″N 15°43′51.70″E
- Żar Mountain (Pol. Góra Żar, also called Magiczna Góra) - a small mountain in Little Beskids in southern Poland; there is a road segment ca. 200 m (660 feet) long circling the mountain where "cars roll uphill"
- The Czarodziejska Górka is a 200-meter (yard) stretch of the road between Strączno and Rutwica near Wałcz in north-west Poland where objects, including cars, roll uphill.
  coordinates: 53°14′7.80″N 16°20′6.30″E
- Izersky antigravity point, near Świeradów-Zdrój, south-western Poland, marked by a stone like the one in Karpacz.
  coordinates: 50°54′47.30″N 15°18′37.70″E

== Portugal ==
- Braga: Three-way intersection behind Bom Jesus do Monte, where both roads are downhill but the left one (the side road) appears as uphill.
  coordinates: 41°33′23″N 8°22′30.65″W
- Viseu: On the CM1225 road ascending to Serra da Arada.
  coordinates: 40°49′25.30″N 8°5′37″W

== Romania ==
- County of Maramureș: the road between Budești and Cavnic.
  coordinates: 47°42′16.9″N 23°55′4.3″E

== Saudi Arabia ==
- Wadi al-Jinn (Valley of Jinns) in Madinah North East of Masjid Al-Nabawi Actual name is Wadi Al Baidah. Wadi Al Jinn (Valley of Jins) name is given by the local tour operators and tourists.
  coordinates: 24°43′22″N 39°26′40″E

== Serbia ==
- In the village of Ivanje on Radan Mountain near Kuršumlija.
  coordinates: 43°0′8.45″N 21°34′40.18″E

== Slovakia ==
- On the road from Lipovce to Lačnov.
  coordinates: 49°3′52.7″N 20°55′59.50″E

== South Africa ==
- Kwazulu-Natal: On the R74 provincial route between Greytown and Weenen.
  coordinates: 28°55′15″S 30°11′49.8″E
- Somerset West, City of Cape Town, Western Cape: Spook Hill, on Parel Vallei Road.
  coordinates: 34°3′28″S 18°51′36.50″E
- Rensburg, Heidelberg, Gauteng: Die Spookbrug, on Plein Street.
  coordinates: 26°31′50.36″S 28°23′11.77″E

== South Korea ==
- Jeju Island: Dokebi Road ("Mysterious Road")
  coordinates: 33°27′3.8″N 126°29′15.9″E

== Spain ==
- Aragón, Province of Zaragoza: Cuesta mágica del Moncayo, near San Martín de la Virgen del Moncayo.
  coordinates: 41°50′0″N 1°48′40″W
- Andalusia, Province of Málaga: Cuesta de Ronda, on the A-369 road near Ronda.
  coordinates: 36°41′55″N 5°10′39.50″W
- Valencian Community, Province of Alicante: Cuesta mágica de Crevillente.
  coordinates: 38°15′34.50″N 0°49′37.80″W

== Sweden ==
- Idre: Trollvägen, Nipfjället
  coordinates: 61°56′58″N 12°49′37″E

== Thailand ==
- "Magic Hill" on the Mae Sot-Tak road (Route 12, part of the Asian Highway 1).
  coordinates: 16°46′5″N 98°38′46.50″E

== Trinidad and Tobago ==
- The magnetic road: On the North Coast Road near Maracas Bay.
  coordinates: 10°45′41″N 61°27′19″W

== Turkey ==
- Bursa: On the Mudanya-Bursa highway (D575).
  coordinates: 40°20′46.50″N 28°55′22.70″E
- Bursa: On a small road in the Uludağ ski resort.
  coordinates: 40°6′47″N 29°8′32″E
- Erzurum: On Gizemli yol.
  coordinates: 39°52′46.30″N 41°18′19.70″E
- Kırklareli: Demirköy Yolu, Yenice, Pınarhisar.
  coordinates: 41°44′35.9″N 27°39′13.27″E

== United Kingdom ==
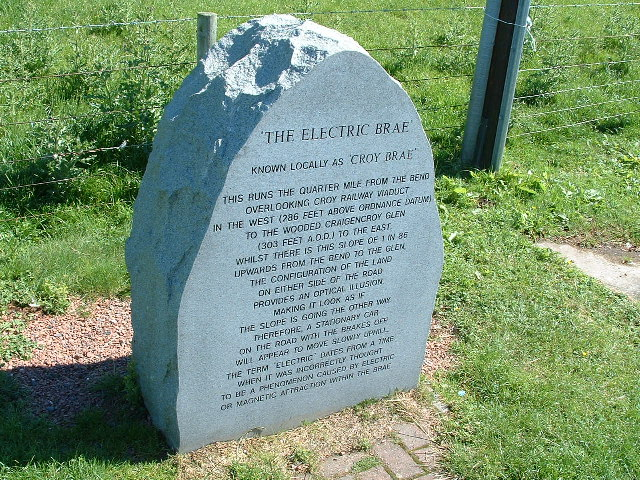
The cairn at the Electric Brae in Ayrshire, Scotland

=== England ===
- Buckinghamshire: Dancers End Lane, Aston Clinton.
  coordinates: 51°47′13.20″N 0°41′40.80″W
- Cambridgeshire: Bogmoor Road, Great Chishill https://www.cambridge-news.co.uk/news/news-opinion/i-tested-mysterious-cambridgeshire-border-34452774?
- Essex: Hangman's Hill, High Beech, Epping Forest.
  coordinates: 51°39′57.40″N 0°1′32.70″E
- West Sussex: Rogate, on the A272 road to the west of the village.

=== Northern Ireland ===
- County Down: The Magic Hill. Mourne Mountains, on the B27 head southeast towards the Spelga Dam
  coordinates: 54°10′49.50″N 6°3′48.45″W

=== Scotland ===
- South Ayrshire: Electric Brae, on the A719 between Dunure and Croy Brae
  coordinates: 55°22′52″N 4°45′26″W

=== Wales ===
- Powys: Llangattock (Crickhowell), Brecon Beacons, approximately 3 miles (4.8 km) west of Llangattock.
  coordinates: 51°50′31.60″N 3°13′10″W

== United States ==
=== Alabama ===
- Gravity Hill Lane at Oak Grove (Talladega County).
  coordinates: 33°12′13.30″N 86°18′29″W
- Henry's Hill near Mount Hope (Lawrence County).
  coordinates: 34°25′48.10″N 87°30′19.60″W
- Burnt Mountain Gravity Hill

Scenic spot, Jasper, GA Pickens County, Georgia

=== Alaska ===
- Anchorage: Upper Huffman Road, Hillside, Anchorage Borough.
  coordinates: 61°6′31″N 149°44′0″W

=== Arkansas ===
- Dyer, near Alma.
  coordinates: 35°30′5″N 94°8′51.50″W
- Helena: Sulphur Springs Road.
  coordinates: 34°32′9″N 90°36′21″W

=== California ===
- Altadena, 1054 E. Loma Alta Dr.
  coordinates: 34°12′0.10″N 118°7′18.60″W
- Moreno Valley, on Nason Street (while driving south, immediately after Elder St).
  coordinates: 33°56′26.50″N 117°11′29.90″W
- Ocotillo, on the off ramp at the exit from I-8 westbound to Mountain Springs road.
  coordinates: 32°40′44.30″N 116°5′57.10″W
- Rohnert Park (in Sonoma County): From U.S. Route 101 (US 101) freeway, take Rohnert Park Expressway east to Petaluma Hill Road, Petaluma Hill Road south to Roberts Road, Roberts Road east to Lichau Road. At an iron gate with the words "Gracias San Antonio" is the start of the gravity hill section (on the western slope of Sonoma Mountain near the Fairfield Osborn Preserve).
  coordinates: 38°20′32.5″N 122°37′13″W
- Santa Cruz: 465 Mystery Spot Road off Branciforte Drive near State Route 17 (SR 17) within the redwood forest. A tourist attraction called "Mystery Spot" is operated at the site.
- San Francisco: In Golden Gate Park, on JFK drive, just West of Transverse Drive, where the water from Rainbow Falls flows towards Lloyd Lake. Coordinates: 37.77042604433751°N 122.48064743194152°W
- Sylmar: On Kagel Canyon Rd.
  coordinates: 34°18′16.50″N 118°22′31.80″W
- Whittier: Site at cemetery in Whittier, on Workman Mill Road, near Rio Hondo College

=== Connecticut ===
- Sterling: On Main Street, just before its intersection with Snake Meadow Hill Road.
  coordinates: 41°44′7.40″N 71°49′42″W

=== Florida ===
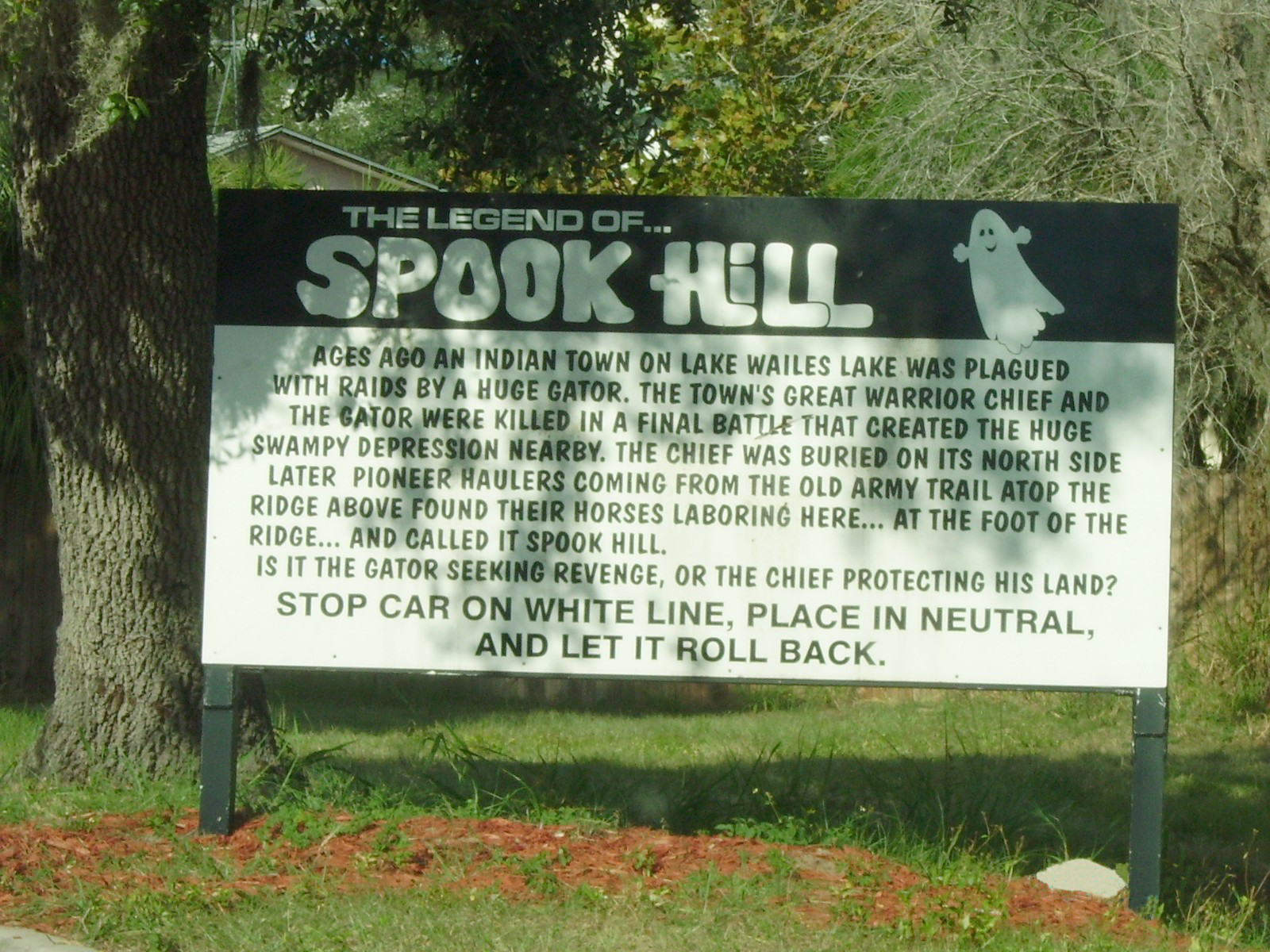
Spook Hill, Lake Wales, Florida

- Lake Wales: Spook Hill, US 27 between Orlando and Tampa
  coordinates: 27°54′43″N 81°34′56.50″W

=== Georgia ===
- Cumming: Booger Hill a.k.a. Booger Mountain
- Fort Gaines: Spook Hill, north of town
  coordinates: 31°43′44.7″N 85°0′38″W

=== Indiana ===
- Mooresville: Gravity Hill.
  coordinates: 39°36′4.7″N 86°24′39.6″W

=== Kentucky ===
- Covington: in Devou Park.
  coordinates: 39°5′9″N 84°31′46″W
- Princeton: about 1 mile (1.6 km) west of Princeton off US 62 lies a gravity hill on Kentucky Route 2618 (KY 2618). Vehicles stop in the tunnel that the Western Kentucky Parkway bridge creates and the vehicle will roll all the way to the end of the road at the stop sign.
  coordinates: 37°6′26″N 87°58′57.2″W

=== Maryland ===
- Burkittsville: On Gapland road (W Main Street).
  coordinates: 39°23′48.7″N 77°38′4″W

=== Massachusetts ===
- Greenfield: Shelburne Road facing east towards Greenfield immediately after the Massachusetts Route 2 (Route 2) overpass.
  coordinates: 42°35′21.5″N 72°37′49″W

=== Michigan ===
- Blaine Township (near Arcadia): Putney Road south of its intersection with Joyfield Road. Cars appear to roll toward the church at the intersection. Local legend claims the church is pulling sinners towards its doors for redemption.
  coordinates: 44°31′49″N 86°9′38″W
- Rose City: at the end of Reasner Road, past Heath Road
  coordinates: 44°27′48″N 84°5′14″W
- Farmington Hills: in Oakwood Cemetery, if you enter by the west gate and stop by a knotted tree, then put your car in neutral, it will appear to roll back uphill.

=== Minnesota ===
- 330th St and 660th Ave., Watkins (Forest City Township)
- Montevideo (Chippewa County): a short ramp off 1st Street toward MN‑7 where cars left in neutral appear to roll “up” the hill.

=== Mississippi ===
- Burnsville

=== Missouri ===
- Freeman: southwest of town near the Kansas state line at the intersection of Missouri Route D (Route D) and East 299th Street. Just outside Louisburg, Kansas.
  coordinates: 38°34′47″N 94°35′39.80″W

=== Montana ===
- Columbia Falls: The Montana Vortex

=== New Jersey ===
- Franklin Lakes: Ewing Avenue exit off Route 208 South
- Jackson: New Prospect Road
  coordinates: 40°9′31.60″N 74°16′3.60″W
- Titusville: On Pleasant Valley Road.
  coordinates: 40°20′16.70″N 74°52′55.40″W

=== New York ===
- Yates County: Spook Hill, on Newell Road.
  coordinates: 42°42′48.20″N 77°18′33.30″W
- Cattaraugus County: On Promised Land Road, Portville.
  coordinates: 42°3′54.30″N 78°21′10.30″W
- Rockland County: On Spook Rock Road, at its intersection with US 202. Very convincing.
  coordinates: 41°9′45.50″N 74°5′42.10″W

=== North Carolina ===
- Boone: Mystery Hill
- Richfield: Gravity Hill on Richfield Rd. Local legends suggest paranormal causes for phenomenon.
  coordinates: 35°35′0″N 80°14′42.30″W
- Scotland County: Gravity Hill

=== North Dakota ===
- Near Sentinel Butte.

=== Ohio ===
- Kirtland Hills: King Memorial Road
  coordinates: 41°38′28.50″N 81°17′44.30″W

=== Oklahoma ===
- Bartlesville: Moose Lodge Road near the railway crossing.
  coordinates: 36°40′12.5″N 95°58′53″W
- Springer: Near Ardmore, on Pitt Road.
  coordinates: 34°20′45.5″N 97°10′40.60″W

=== Oregon ===
- Gold Hill: the Oregon Vortex

=== Pennsylvania ===
- Near Lewisberry, York County, on Pleasantview Road (also rendered Pleasant View Road) at its intersection with Pennsylvania Route 177 (PA 177). This is an extremely convincing site.
  coordinates: 40°9′11.5″N 76°50′23.40″W
- North Park, Pittsburgh: Intersection of McKinney Road and Kummer Road.
  coordinates: 40°36′45.70″N 80°1′32.90″W
- New Paris: Gravity Hill Road (two gravity hills in this area).
  coordinates: 40°6′34″N 78°41′23.50″W
- Near Uniontown: Laurel Caverns

=== South Dakota ===
- Rapid City: Cosmos Mystery Area, 16 miles (26 km) south of Rapid City on US 16, 6 miles (9.7 km) from Mount Rushmore

=== Texas ===
- El Paso: Thunderbird Drive facing south.
  coordinates: 31°50′37″N 106°31′3″W
- San Antonio: Just east of the San Antonio Missions National Historical Park at the railway crossing at Villamain Road and Shane Road.
  coordinates: 29°19′2″N 98°26′36″W

=== Utah ===
- Salt Lake City: A few blocks northeast of the Capitol building in Salt Lake City. A small road (Bonneville Boulevard) loops around a park called Memory Grove.
  coordinates: 40°47′22″N 111°52′45″W
- Copperton: Driving east along State Route 48 you'll come upon a train bridge. Put your vehicle in neutral under it and you'll roll "uphill". coordinates: 40°33′58″N 112°5′20.5″W

=== Virginia ===
- Danville: Berry Hill Road (US 311/SR 863) and Oak Hill Road (SR 862)
  coordinates: 36°33′15.50″N 79°35′54.80″W

=== Washington ===
- Prosser: Near a small farm on North Crosby Road, approximately 10 miles (16 km) northeast of Prosser.
  coordinates: 46°21′44″N 119°43′25.70″W

=== Wisconsin ===
- Shullsburg: Judgement Street, just after Rennick Road.
  coordinates: 42°32′51″N 90°14′0″W
- Stockbridge: Joe Road, 3 mi (4.8 km) south of Stockbridge west off Wisconsin Highway 55 (WIS 55).
  coordinates: 44°1′41″N 88°18′25.70″W

=== Wyoming ===
- Casper: Garden Creek Road, near the entrance to Rotary Park, when going toward Casper Mountain Road.
  coordinates: 42°46′25.4″N 106°19′58.70″W

== Uruguay ==
- Maldonado Department: Cumbres de la Ballena.

== Uzbekistan ==
- Near Boysun.
  coordinates: 38°16′55″N 67°14′53.20″E
