= Magnetic Hill (disambiguation) =

Magnetic Hill may refer to:

- A magnetic hill, also called a gravity hill, a type of optical illusion created by the surrounding landscape
  - List of magnetic hills, specific geographical gravity hill locations:
    - Magnetic Hill (Canada), a tourist attraction, featuring a gravity hill, a theme park, a miniature railroad, and Magnetic Hill Golf Course
    - Magnetic Hill (India)
- Magnetic Hill Concert Site, one of the largest live music venues in Canada
- Magnetic Hill School, a school in Lutes Mountain, New Brunswick
- Magnetic Hill Zoo, the largest zoo in Atlantic Canada
- "Magnetic Hill", a song by Canadian rock band Land of Talk
