= Electric Brae =

Gravity hill in South Ayrshire, Scotland

Coordinates: 55°22.85′N 4°45.4167′W

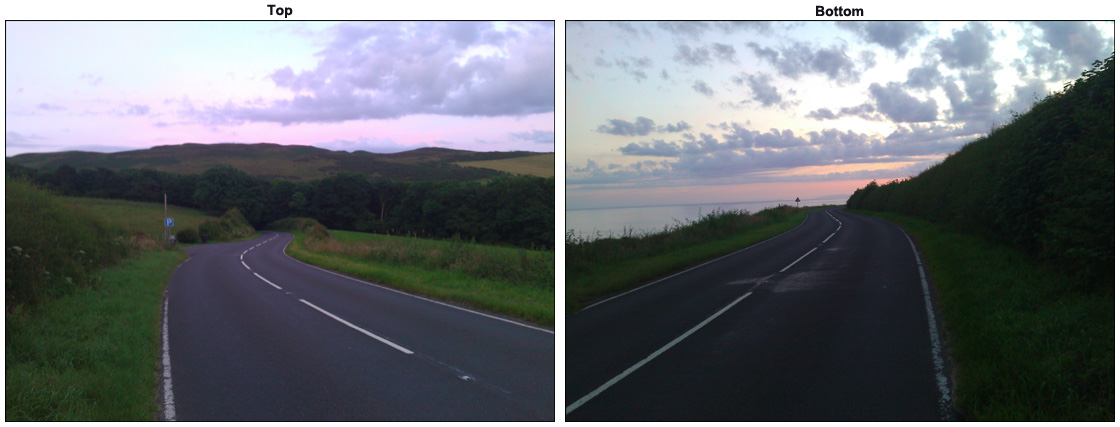
The road that appears to be running downhill is actually running uphill, and vice versa. Photographs taken from the middle of the brae.

The Electric Brae is a gravity hill in South Ayrshire, Scotland, where a freewheeling vehicle will appear to be drawn uphill by some mysterious attraction. The phenomenon is an optical illusion.

== Etymology ==
The term "Electric" dates from a time when it was incorrectly thought to be a phenomenon caused by electric or magnetic attraction within the Brae. The Lowland Scots word brae means a hill-slope or brow (with which it is cognate). The name has also been applied to other slopes in Scotland.

== Location ==
There is more than one stretch of road known as the Electric Brae. The most famous is on the A719, south of Dunure, not far from Ayr, between Drumshrang and Knoweside. Metal road signs that used to mark the location have tended to be taken by visitors, and have been replaced by a stone inscribed with an explanation of the phenomenon. (Note: The inscription on the stone reads: The ELECTRIC BRAE, known locally as 'CROY BRAE')

== Explanation ==
Although the road appears to be running uphill, a suitably free-running vehicle will slowly move off from a standstill. It was widely believed that vehicles were being propelled uphill by a mysterious magnetic force, but the road's apparently uphill slope is an optical illusion. This runs the quarter of a mile from the bend overlooking Croy railway viaduct in the west (286 feet Above Ordnance Datum) to the wooded Craigencroy Glen (303 feet A.O.D.) to the east. Whilst there is this slope of 1 in 86 upwards from the bend to the Glen, the configuration of the land on either side of the road provides an optical illusion making it look as if the slope is going the other way. Therefore, a stationary car on the road with the brakes off will appear to move slowly uphill.

There are hundreds of gravity hills around the world. The explanation often given for the phenomenon is that of a visual illusion, similar to the well-known Ames room, in which balls can appear to roll against gravity.

== World War II visitors ==
During the Second World War General Dwight D Eisenhower had a flat at nearby Culzean Castle. Eisenhower took visitors to see the phenomenon. Many other American personnel from the air-base at Prestwick also visited.

== See also ==
- List of gravity hills
