= Spook Hill =

Gravity hill in Florida

- U.S. National Register of Historic Places
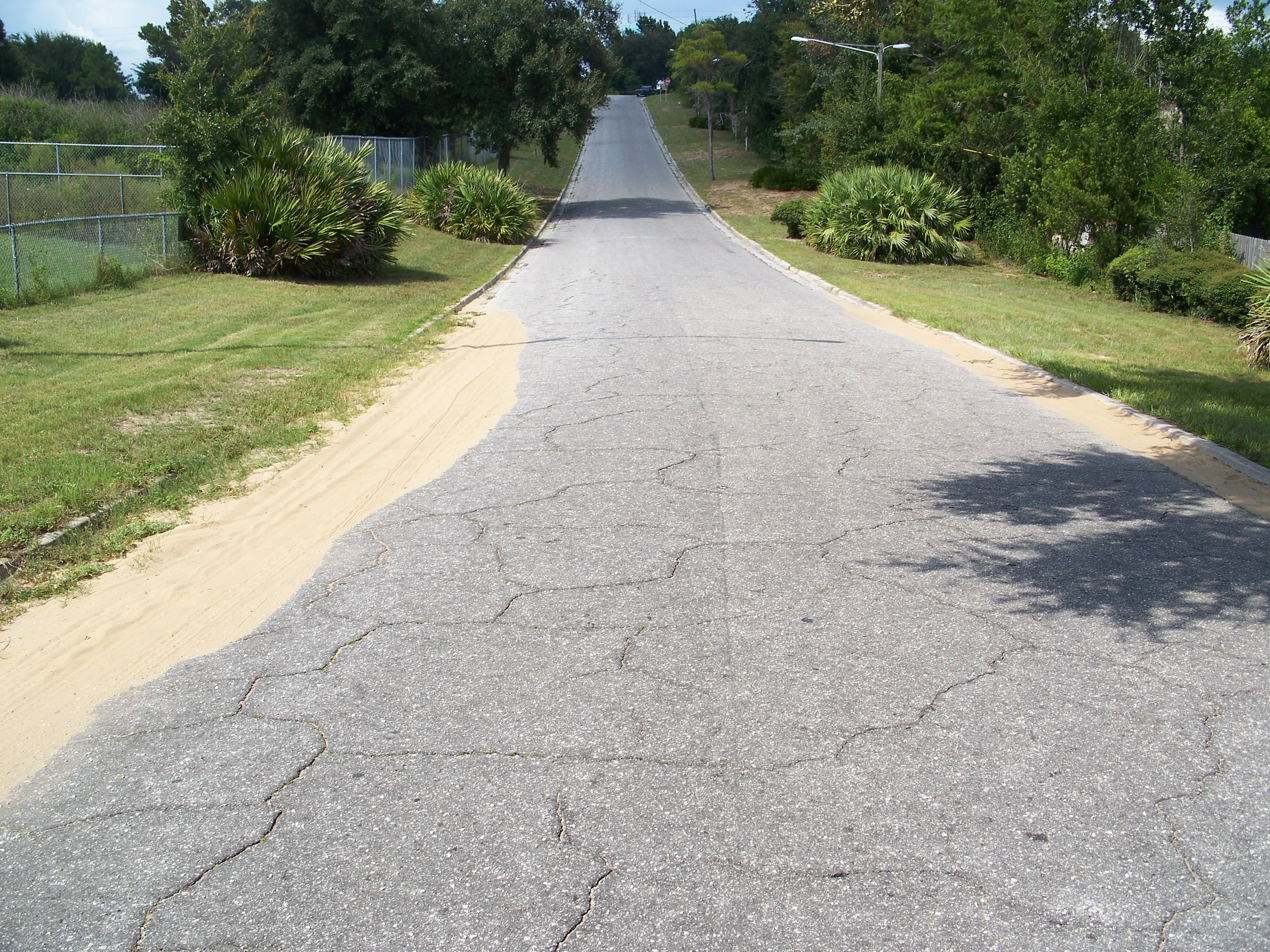
- Spook Hill, looking north

- Location within Florida Location within the United States
- Location: North Wales Dr. between Burns Ave. and Spook Hill Elementary; Lake Wales, Florida
- Coordinates: 27.912°N 81.582°W
- Built: 1960
- NRHP reference No.: 100003585
- Added to NRHP: April 5, 2019

Spook Hill is a gravity hill, an optical illusion in Lake Wales, Florida, where cars appear to roll up the spooky hill.

Spook Hill is located on the Lake Wales Ridge, a geologically significant range of sand and limestone hills, which were islands from two to three million years ago, when sea levels were much higher than at present.

The attraction is adjacent to Spook Hill Elementary School, which adopted Casper the Friendly Ghost as their school mascot. The attraction is also close to the Bok Tower.

Spook Hill received national media attention when an article about it appeared on the front page of the Wall Street Journal on October 25, 1990, and it was featured in a segment on CBS Morning News with Charles Osgood on November 5, 1990. It was listed on the National Register of Historic Places in 2019.

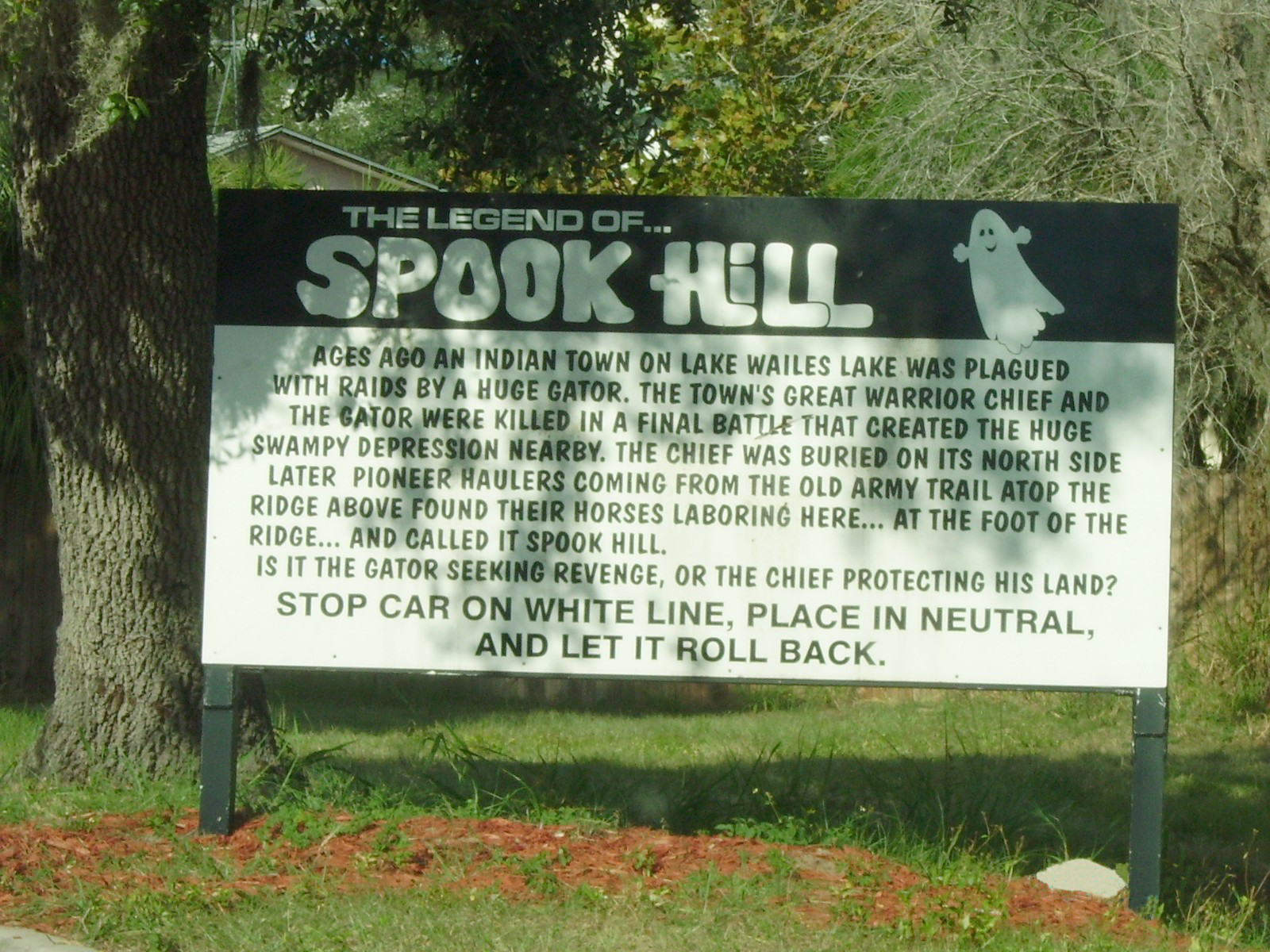
Spook Hill in Lake Wales, Florida. One of central Florida's lesser known and older attractions.

== See also ==
- List of gravity hills
- According to local lore, a Native American chief once battled a giant alligator on this hill; both died in the struggle, and their spirits are said to cause cars to roll uphill. Another tale, spread by a 1950s Lake Wales pamphlet, claims that two retired pirates were buried here and their ghosts push the cars uphill as a prank.
