= Nimo, Ladakh =

Nimo སྙེ་མོ་ Nyemo Nimmoo Nimu Nimmu Snymoo
- Town
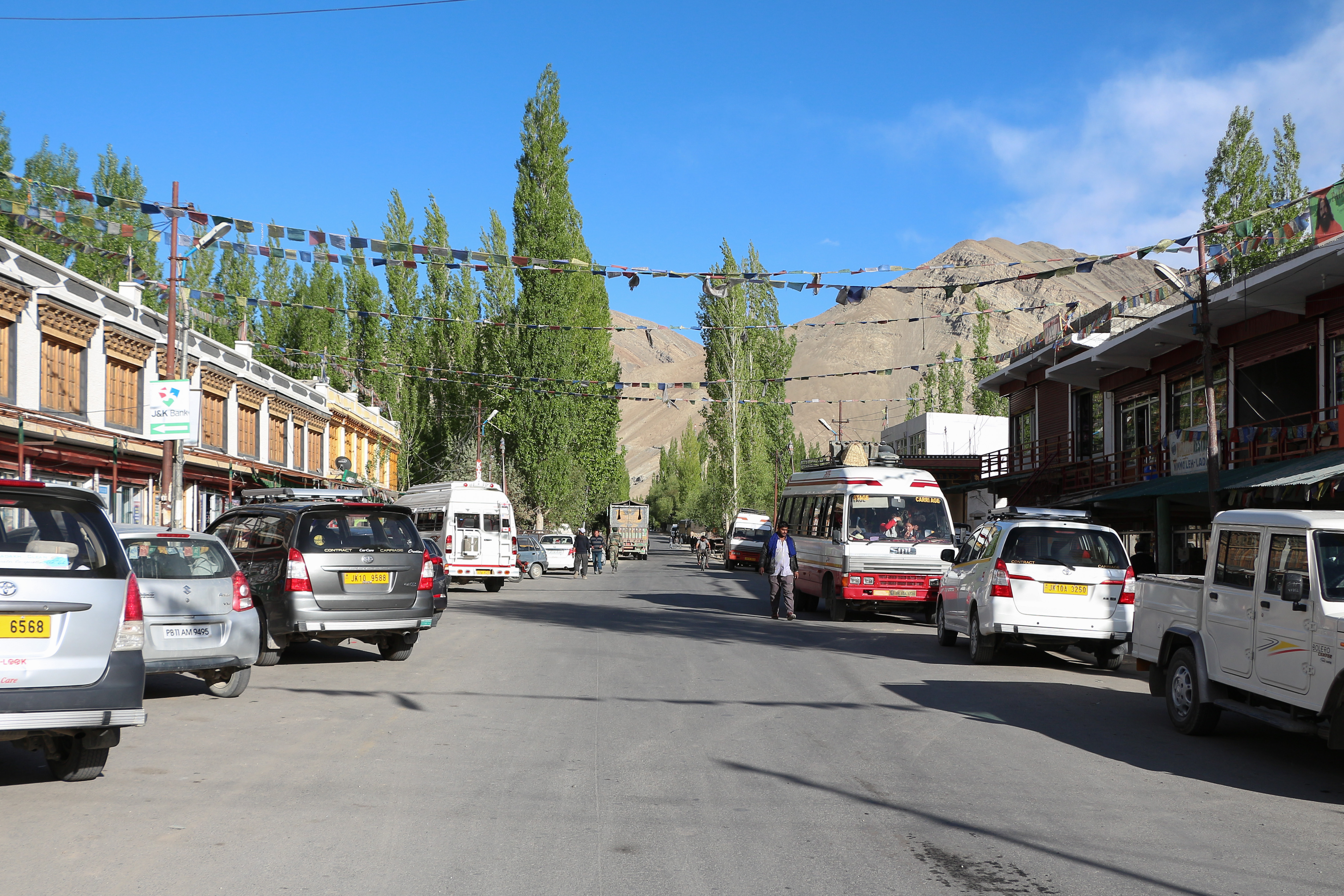
- A view of Nimo in Sham district, Ladakh, India

- Location in Ladakh, India Nimo (India)
- Coordinates: 34.1951812°N 77.335314°E
- Country: India
- Union Territory: Ladakh
- District: Leh
- Tehsil: Basgo
- Elevation: 3,140 m (10,300 ft)

Population (2011)
  - Total: 1,134

Languages
  - Official: Ladakhi, Hindi, English
- Time zone: UTC+5:30 (IST)
- 2011 census code: 852

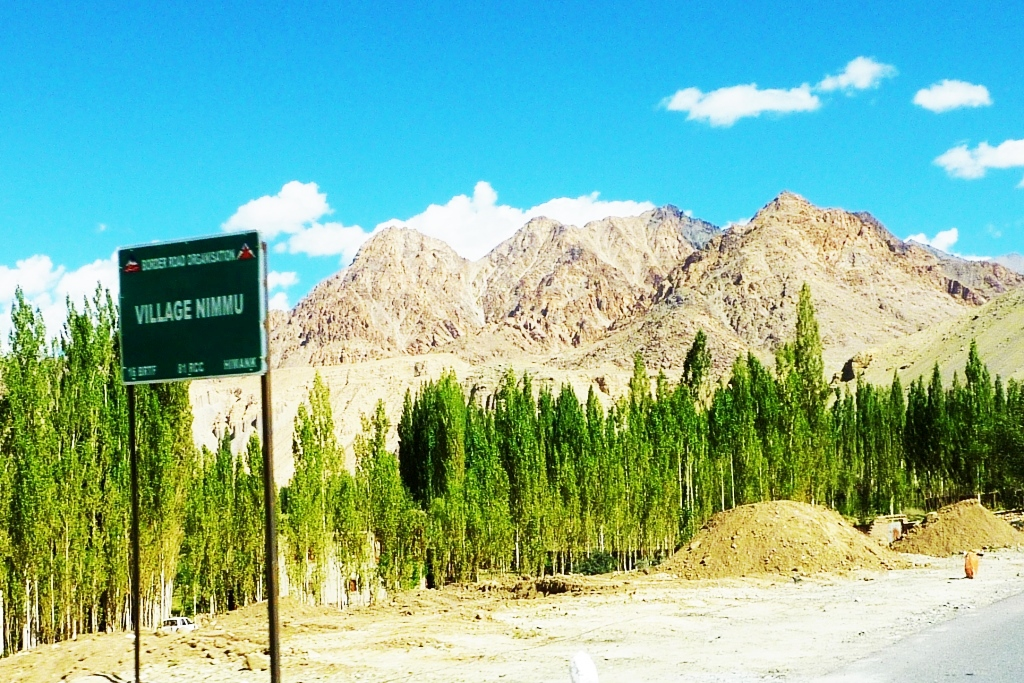
Sign for Nimmu Village, Ladakh

Nimo (Alternative spellings include Nimoo, Nimmoo , Nimmu , Nyemo or Nimu ) (Tibetan: སྙེ་མོ་, Wylie: snye mo) is a Town and the headquarters of an eponymous community development block in the Leh district of Ladakh, India. It is located in the Basgo tehsil, 35 km from Leh.

Nimoo is a stop for all the river rafting groups and is the main starting point for the annually held all-India river rafting expedition on the Indus River.
The temperature here varies from 40 °C in summer to −29 °C in winter. Due to such a harsh climate and extreme weather conditions, this area has very little vegetation cover (as seen in the picture on the right). It has a hydroelectric power plant known as the Nimu-Bazgo dam.

Magnet Hill is a gravity defying road 7.5 km southeast of Nimoo.

== History ==
On 6 August 2010, the village was impacted by the 2010 Ladakh floods.

== Tourism ==
Nimo has several monasteries and orchards. Rafting in the Indus River (Grade 1) and rafting in the Zanskar River (Grade 2) are popular outdoor sports. The confluence of Zanskar and Indus rivers is located close by.

Nimoo is also very famous for its tea-samosa and Chola-puri at Nimoo Market.

=== Magnetic hill optical illusion ===
Magnet Hill or Nimoo-Leh Magnet Hill is a gravity hill located near Leh in Ladakh, India. Due to the surrounding geographical features, it has an optical illusion where vehicles seem to roll uphill in defiance of gravity when they are, in fact, rolling downhill. It is 7.5 km southeast of Nimo and 26.5 km west of Leh on Srinagar-Ladakh road.

== Religious significance ==
Nimo is religiously significant for Buddhism and Sikhism. Along with the Ganges, the Indus river is also considered very important in Hindu theology.

Sri Pathar Sahib Gurudwara is also situated in this town and is important to Sikhs.

== Demographics ==
According to the 2011 census of India, Nimo has 193 households. The effective literacy rate (i.e. the literacy rate of population excluding children aged 6 and below) is 72.51%.

Demographics (2011 Census)
| | Total | Male | Female |
|---|---|---|---|
| Population | 1134 | 568 | 566 |
| Children aged below 6 years | 119 | 51 | 68 |
| Scheduled caste | 0 | 0 | 0 |
| Scheduled tribe | 1071 | 535 | 536 |
| Literates | 736 | 405 | 331 |
| Workers (all) | 603 | 364 | 239 |
| Main workers (total) | 509 | 336 | 173 |
| Main workers: Cultivators | 224 | 148 | 76 |
| Main workers: Agricultural labourers | 9 | 4 | 5 |
| Main workers: Household industry workers | 1 | 0 | 1 |
| Main workers: Other | 275 | 184 | 91 |
| Marginal workers (total) | 94 | 28 | 66 |
| Marginal workers: Cultivators | 58 | 15 | 43 |
| Marginal workers: Agricultural labourers | 4 | 1 | 3 |
| Marginal workers: Household industry workers | 1 | 1 | 0 |
| Marginal workers: Others | 31 | 11 | 20 |
| Non-workers | 531 | 204 | 327 |
