= Tulsishyam =

- Village
- Tulsishyam Temple

- Location in Gujarat Tulsishyam (India)
- Coordinates: 21.052°N 71.025°E
- Country: India
- State: Gujarat

Languages
  - Official: Gujarati, Hindi
- Time zone: UTC+5:30 (IST)
- Vehicle registration: GJ
- Website: gujaratindia.com

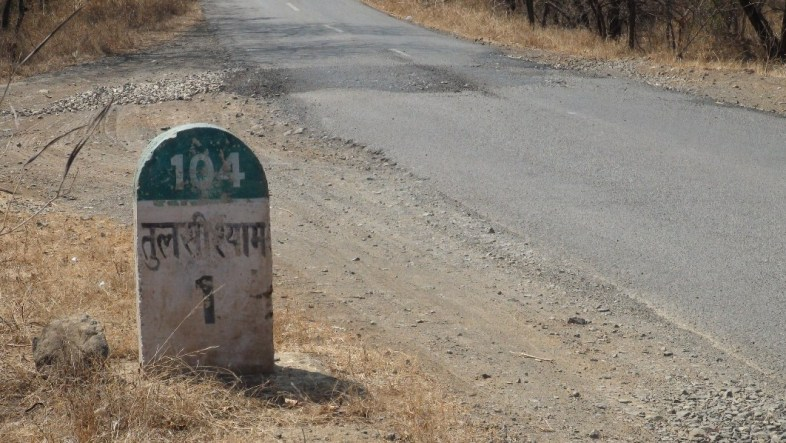
Place of Gravity Hill phenomenon

Tulsishyam is on the border of Amreli district & Junagadh district and Gir Somnath district, in the Gir National Park in Gujarat state of India.

== Gravity hill ==
Tulsishyam Anti Gravity Hill is a gravity hill where vehicles seems to defy the gravity and roll uphill. The effect is an optical illusion caused by the surrounding terrain; the road actually slopes downhill, but the horizon line is hidden, tricking drivers into thinking they are rolling uphill.
