= 2010 Ladakh floods =

Natural disaster in India

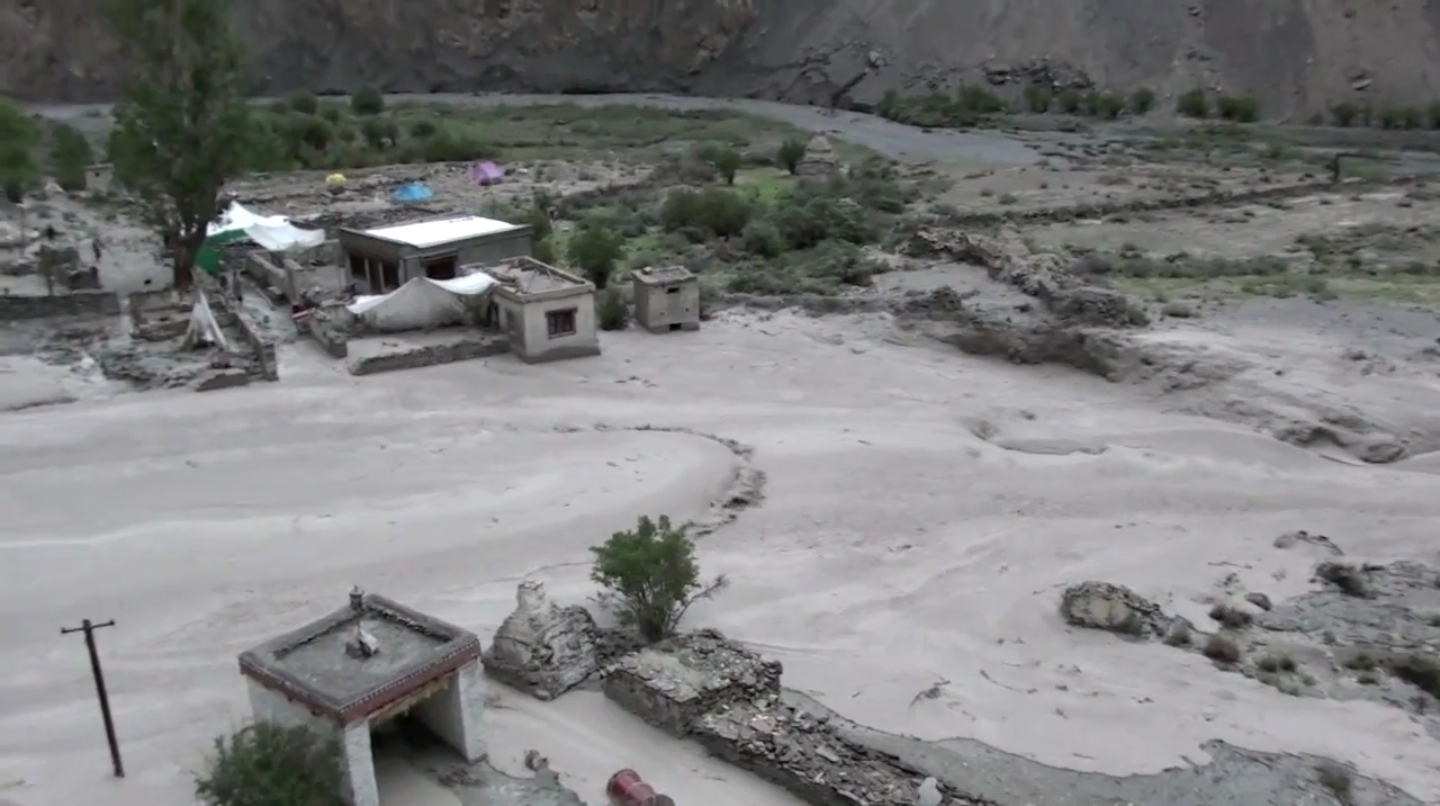
- Date: 6 August 2010
- Location: Leh, and numerous other villages in the Ladakh Range
- Deaths: 255–600
- Injuries: 220
- Missing: 29
- Property damage: ₹1.33 billion

Floods occurred on 6 August 2010 across a large part of Ladakh, then part of the state of Jammu and Kashmir. 71 towns and villages were damaged, including the main town in the area, Leh. At least 255 people are reported to have died, six of whom were foreign tourists, after a cloudburst and heavy overnight rains triggered flash floods, mudflows, and debris flows. 200 people were reported missing in the initial aftermath of the storm, and thousands more were rendered homeless after the flooding caused extensive damage to property and infrastructure. Overall, 9,000 people were directly affected by the event.

== History ==
Leh is the largest town in the Ladakh region of the Indian state of Jammu and Kashmir. It is on a plateau at around 3,500 metres (11,500 ft) above sea level and usually receives very little rainfall, around 100 millimetres (3.9 in) per year. Described as a "high-altitude cold desert", the area has sparse rainfall and a heavy downpour is a rare occurrence. The average rainfall in Leh for the month of August is 15.4 millimetres (0.61 in), with highest rainfall ever recorded during a single 24-hour period being 51.3 millimetres (2.02 in), recorded on 22 August 1933.

The town is predominantly Buddhist. Tourists are attracted by its natural environment. August is the peak tourist season when thousands of western backpackers come to the area. Leh receives about 60,000 foreign and 150,000 domestic tourists annually.

== Flooding and damage ==
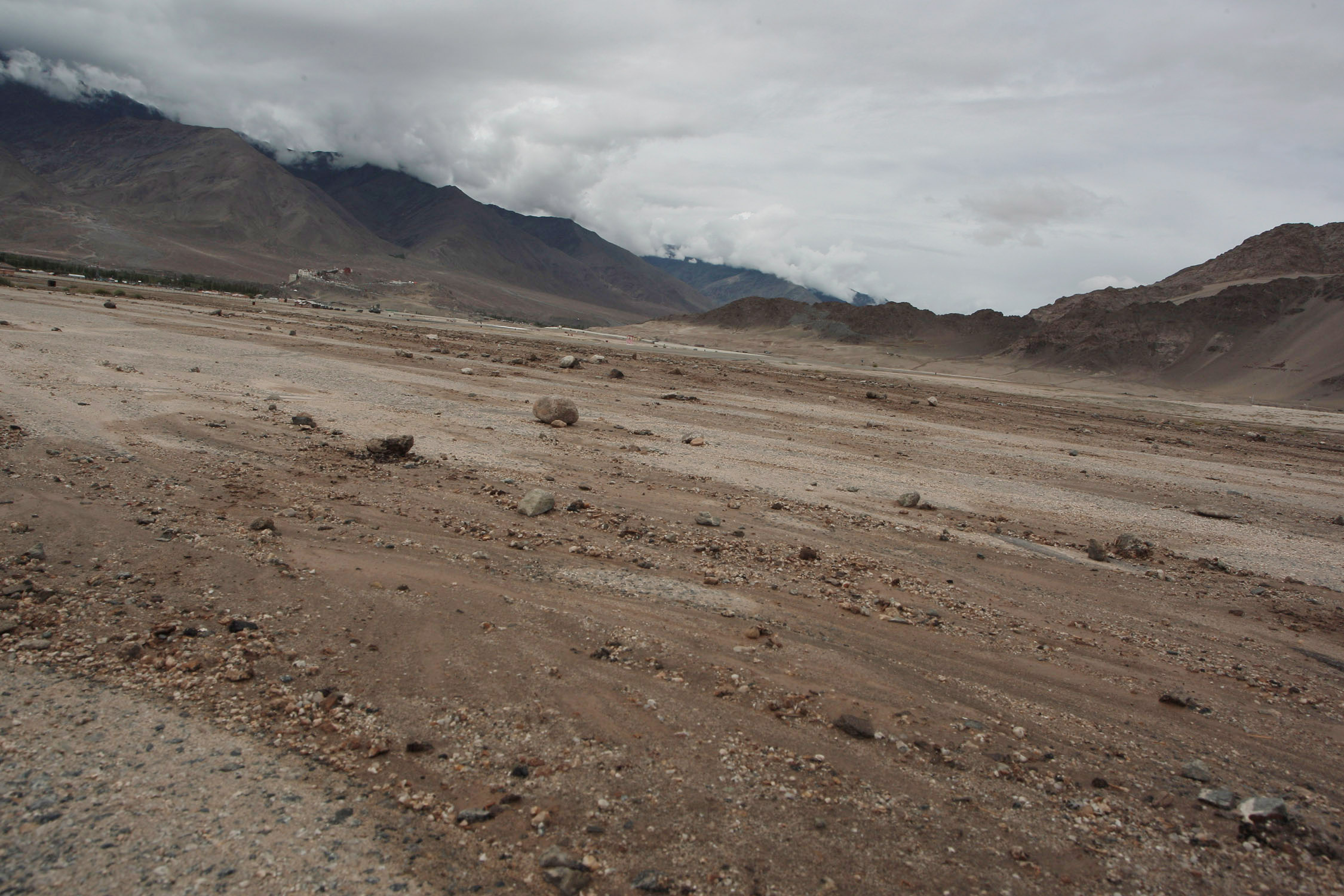
Condition of the Leh Airfield after the cloud burst, the Runway and required part for operation is already made clear.

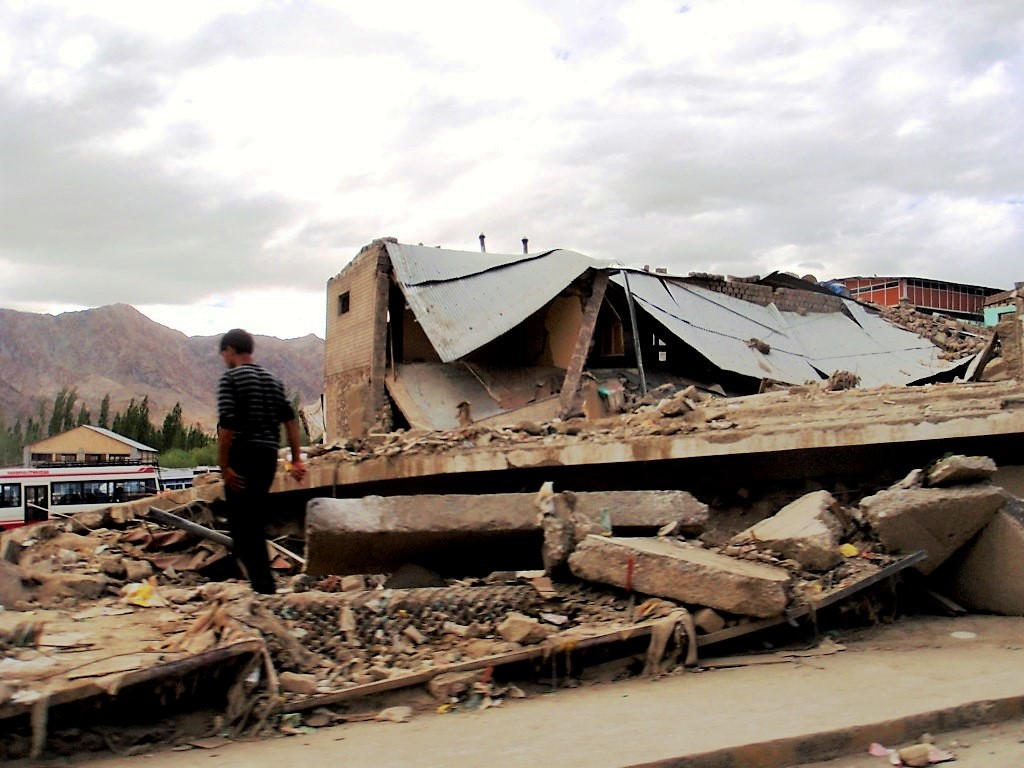
Damage from floods. Leh.

The flash floods happened after a night of heavy downpour. The cloudburst itself occurred between 0000 and 0030 hours IST on 6 August 2010, leading to flash flooding, debris flows, and mudflows over the region. The rainfall distribution was highly spatially variable. The most intense part of the storm was focused in a 6-kilometre (3.7 mi)-wide band parallel to, and a few kilometers from, the river Indus. This band was centred over most of the major settlements in the area, including Leh.

Outside the band, the rainfall intensity was unremarkable; the only weather station in the area, at Leh airport, recorded just 12.8 millimetres (0.50 in) of total rainfall for the night of 6 August. However, within it precipitation intensities were over an order of magnitude higher, peaking at at least 150 mm/h (5.9 in/h) over Leh during the most intense part of the storm. Estimates of the maximum total rainfall in some places were as high as 250 millimetres (9.8 in). Note that the implied 75 millimetres (3.0 in) of rain over Leh during the most intense part of the storm is equivalent to around a year's worth of rain falling in 30 minutes.

The rains occurred at night, and surprised everyone. In Leh, many buildings were destroyed including hospitals, the bus terminal, radio station transmitter, telephone exchange and mobile-phone towers. BSNL communication systems were fully destroyed. Communications were later restored by the Indian Army. The local bus station was severely damaged and some of the buses were carried more than a mile by the mud. The city's airport was damaged but was rapidly repaired to allow relief flights the following day. The village of Choglamsar on the outskirts of the city was particularly badly hit.

In neighbouring valleys, large numbers of smaller villages which lay under the main rainfall band were also heavily damaged, with large numbers of casualties. As in Leh, much of the destruction was caused by debris flows coming from the rocky sidewalls of the valleys, not by the flooding itself. Notable impacts occurred in Sobu, Phyang, Nimu, Nyeh, and Basgo villages. In total, almost 1,500 homes in 71 settlements across the area were reported to have been damaged. Detailed mapping and estimation of the entrapped sediment mass within the transverse stream valleys of various sectors of Himalaya is required to predict the style of mass transfer during such events.

All of the estimated 3,000 tourists in Leh, including 1,000 foreigners were safe according to local officials. Outside the town, six tourists were reported killed. However, official documents indicate that at least 255 local residents were killed, with a further 29 never found. The true toll may have been significantly higher, perhaps more than 600 people.

== Response ==
The rescue efforts were hampered by gushing water and mud which was 10 feet high in places. In addition many of the roads and bridges leading to Leh were damaged, making it difficult to truck in relief supplies. Four hundred critically wounded people were evacuated and some were admitted to the army hospital in Leh. Indian Army soldiers launched a massive rescue operation. Home minister P. Chidambaram said that over 6,000 security personnel were deployed in Leh for rescue operations. Prime minister Manmohan Singh expressed grief and announced compensation of Rs. 100,000 to the kin of deceased and Rs. 50,000 for those injured. Chief Minister of the state Omar Abdullah directed the administration to undertake relief effort on a war footing.

== See also ==
- Ladakh Marathon
- Global storm activity of 2010
- 2008 South China floods
- 2010 Pakistan floods
- 2010 China floods
- Monsoon
