= Wadi Al Baida =

Valley in Medina Province, Saudi Arabia

Wadi al-Baida
- Wadi al-Jinn
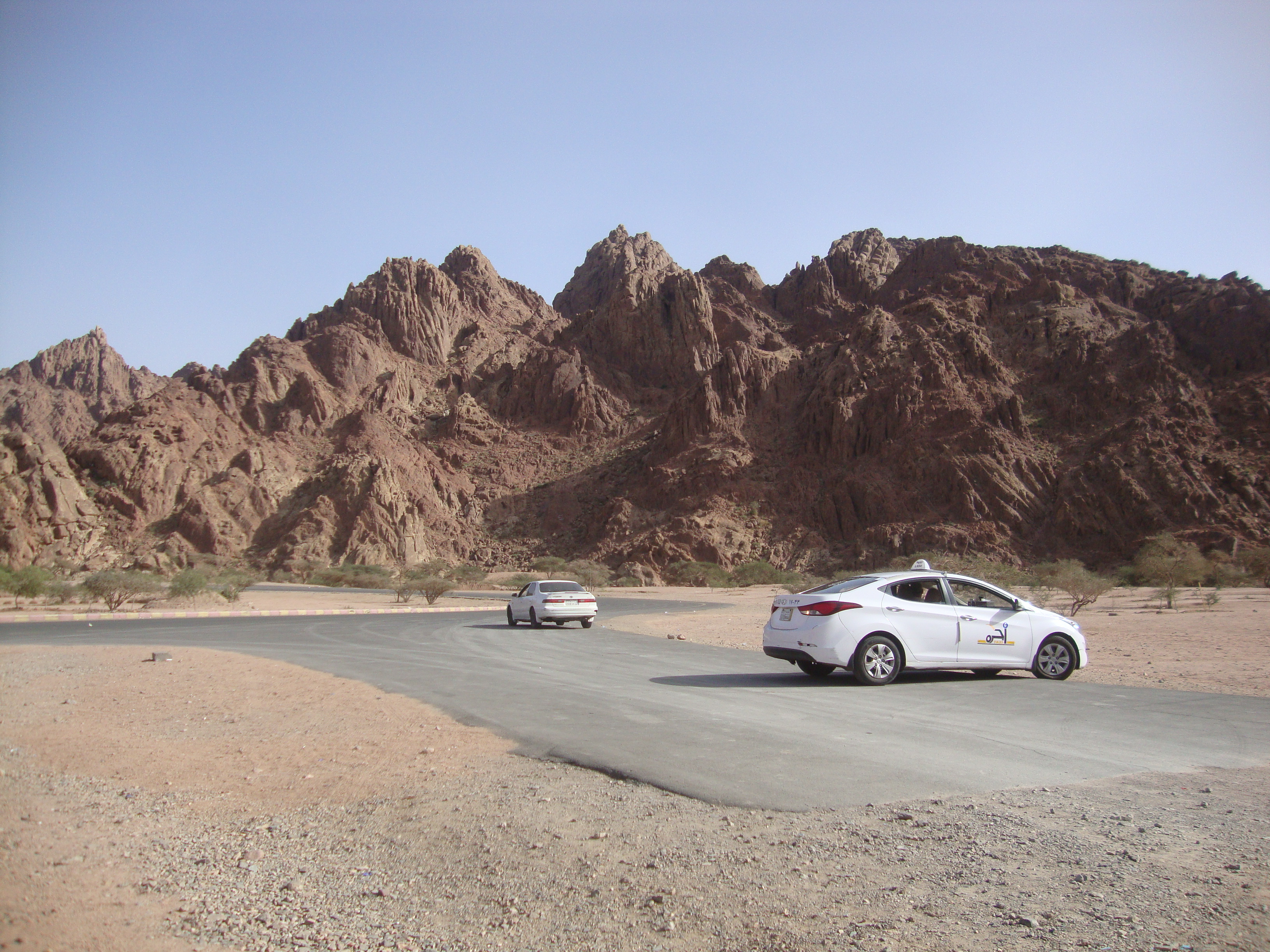
- Wadi al-Jinn, 2016

- Location within Saudi Arabia Location within Asia

Geography
- Country: Saudi Arabia
- State/Province: Medina Province
- Coordinates: 24°43′22″N 39°26′40″E
- Interactive map of Wadi al-Baida

Wadi al-Baida (Arabic: وادي البيضاء, romanized: Wādī al-Baīḍāʾ, lit. 'The White Valley'), locally known as Wadi al-Jinn (Arabic: وادي الجن, romanized: Wādī al-Jinn, lit. 'Valley of the Jinns'), is a valley and an anti-gravity hill in al-Baida Park located approximately 30 kilometers northwest of Medina in the Medina Province of Saudi Arabia. Owing to its optical illusion, vehicles left out of gear in the valley appear to be rolling uphill against the gravity, thus, making the area popular among locals and pilgrims to be purportedly haunted by Jinns, the shape-shifting supernatural creatures mentioned in both pre-Islamic Arabian folklores and Islamic beliefs. However, the Al Madinah Region Development Authority in 2020 rebutted claims of any spiritual presence in the valley.
