= Moscufo =

- Comune
- Comune di Moscufo
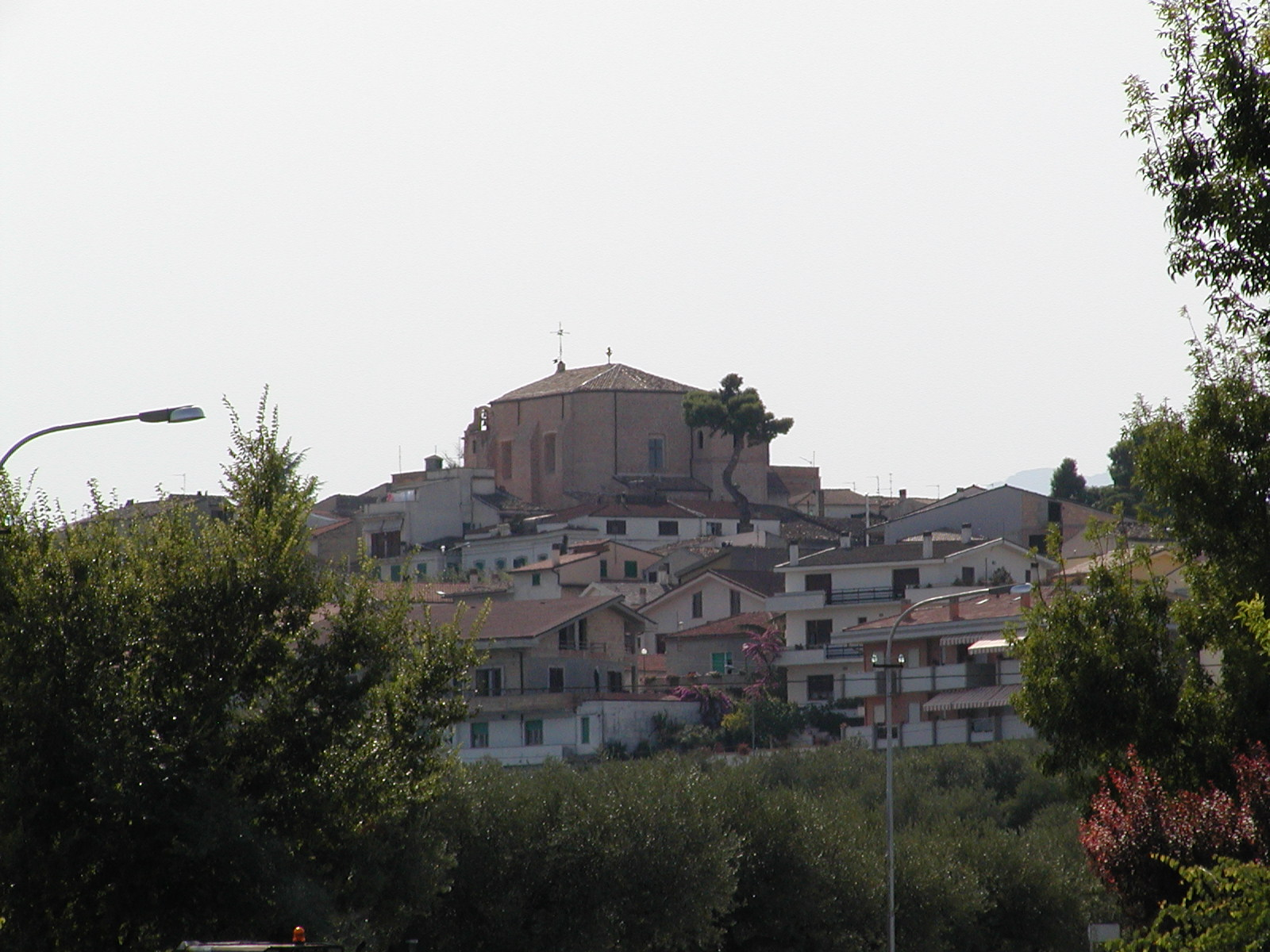
- View of Moscufo

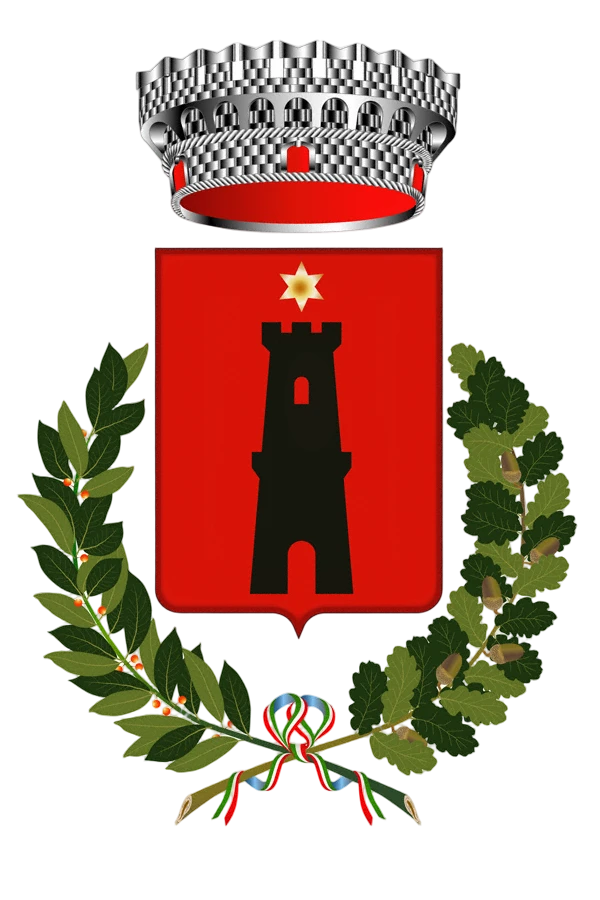
- Coat of arms

- Location within Italy Location within Abruzzo
- Coordinates: 42°26′N 14°3′E
- Country: Italy
- Region: Abruzzo
- Province: Pescara (PE)
- Frazioni: Bivio Casone, Casale, Moscufo Scalo, Pischiarano, Selvaiella, Senarica, Valle Pelillo, Villa Sibi

Government
  - Mayor: Claudio De Collibus

Area
  - Total: 20.26 km^{2} (7.82 sq mi)
- Elevation: 246 m (807 ft)

Population (30 September 2021)
  - Total: 3,093
  - Density: 152.7/km^{2} (395.4/sq mi)
- Demonym: Moscufesi
- Time zone: UTC+1 (CET)
  - Summer (DST): UTC+2 (CEST)
- Postal code: 65010
- Dialing code: 085
- Patron saint: Saint Christopher
- Saint day: July 25
- Website: Official website

Moscufo (locally Muscùfe) is a comune and town in the province of Pescara in the Abruzzo region of Italy.

== Main sights ==
- Parish church of San Cristoforo
- Palazzo Orsini
- Abbey church of Santa Maria del Lago (12th century), an example of Romanesque architecture. Its interior is decorated with frescoes, and include a polychrome ambon, sculpted with biblical scenes by the same master Nicodemo who also worked in the church of Santa Maria in Valle Porclaneta.

== Twin towns ==
- Mława, Poland

== Sources ==
- "Moscufo". Borghi e paesi d'Abruzzo. Vol. 9. Pescara: Carsa Edizioni. 2008.
