= Magliano de' Marsi =

- Comune
- Comune di Magliano de' Marsi
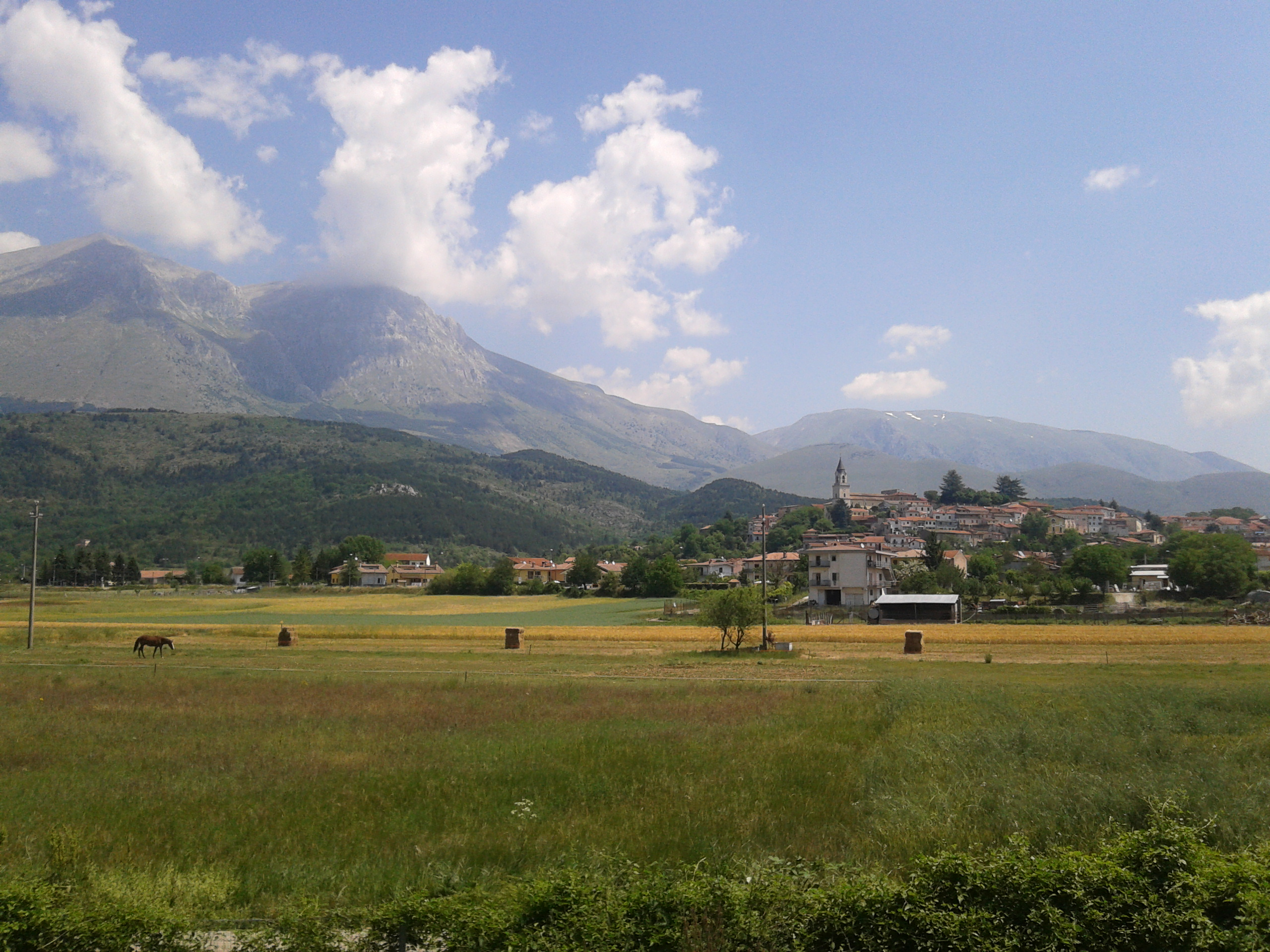

- Location within Italy Location within Abruzzo
- Coordinates: 42°5′33″N 13°21′53″E
- Country: Italy
- Region: Abruzzo
- Province: L'Aquila (AQ)
- Frazioni: Marano dei Marsi, Rosciolo dei Marsi

Government
  - Mayor: Pasqualino Di Cristofano

Area
  - Total: 70.93 km^{2} (27.39 sq mi)
- Elevation: 728 m (2,388 ft)

Population (31 December 2020)
  - Total: 3,570
  - Density: 50.3/km^{2} (130/sq mi)
- Demonym: Maglianesi
- Time zone: UTC+1 (CET)
  - Summer (DST): UTC+2 (CEST)
- Postal code: 67062
- Dialing code: 0863
- Patron saint: St. Lucy
- Saint day: 13 December
- Website: Official website

Magliano de' Marsi is a comune and town in the province of L'Aquila in the Abruzzo region of southern-central Italy. The town is in the historical region Marsica.

== Main sights ==
- Church of Santa Lucia, in late Gothic-Romanesque style, with Baroque elements.
- 14th century church of Madonna di Loreto
- Santa Maria in Valle Porclaneta
- Monumental tomb of King Perseus, the last king of the Macedonians. Buried along the Via Valeria near Magliano de' Marsi (Aquila), as indicated on table II SE of the page 145 of the Military Geographical Institute's map.

== Twin towns ==
- Villa Sant'Angelo, Italy
