= Magnetic Hill (India) =

Cyclop hill at Leh, India

Coordinates: 34.1710°N 77.3525°E

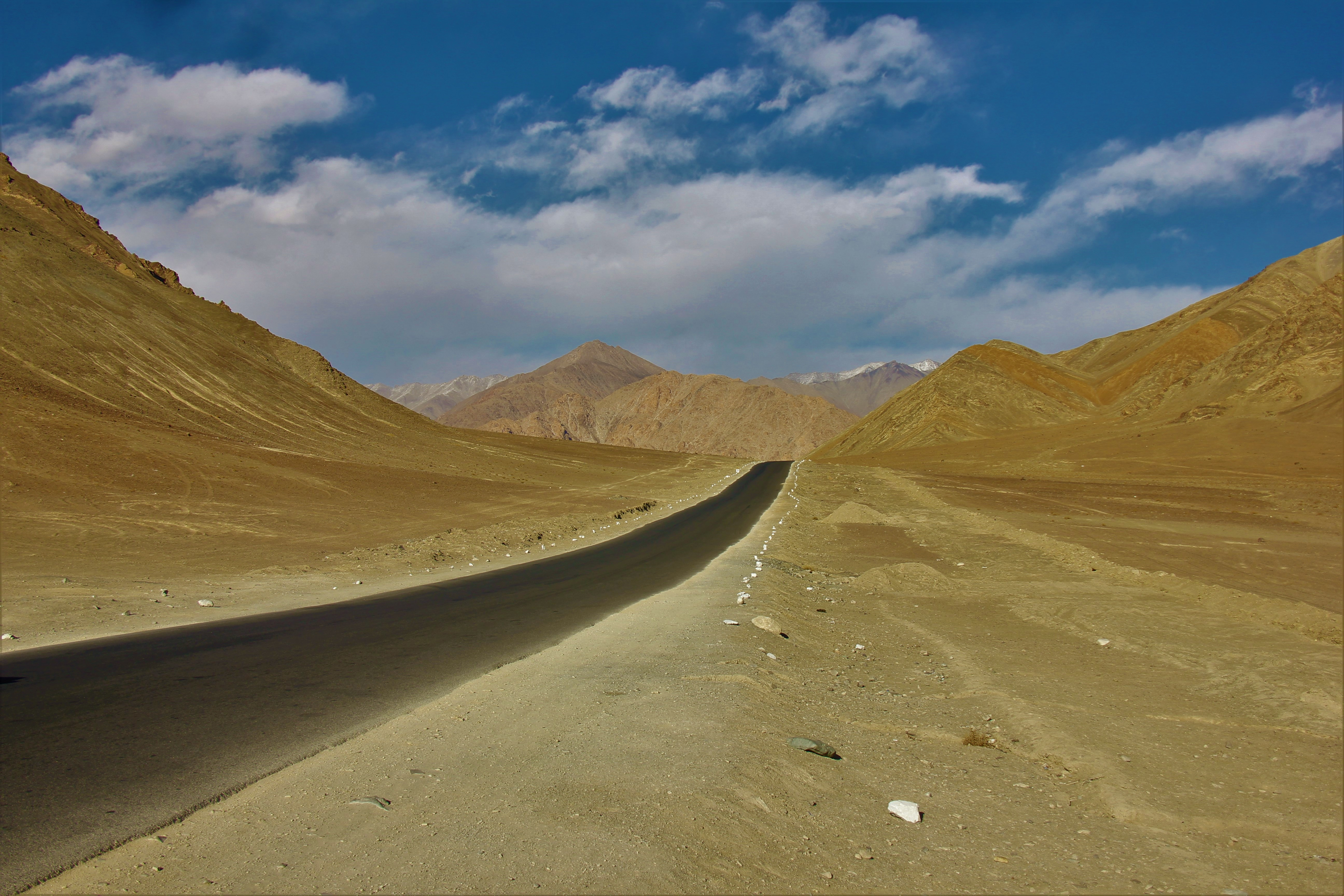
Magnetic Hill in Ladakh, India.

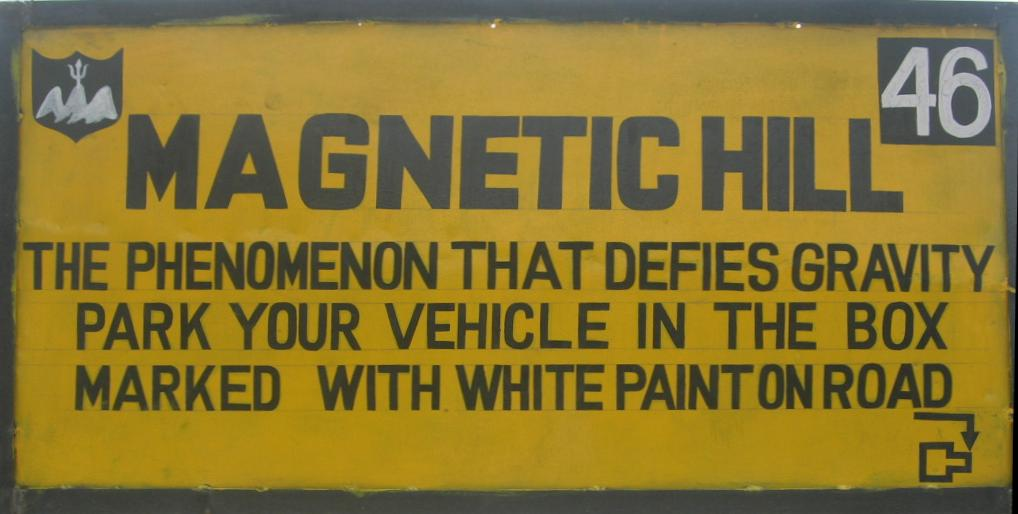
A sign board near the Magnetic Hill in Ladakh, India.

Magnetic Hill is a gravity hill located, between Khalatse and Leh in Sham district of Ladakh, India. The layout of the area and surrounding slopes create the optical illusion of a hill. The hill road is actually a downhill road. Objects and cars on the hill road may appear to roll uphill in defiance of gravity when they are, in fact, rolling downhill. It is 7.5 kilometres (4.7 mi) southeast of Nimmoo and 26.5 km west of Leh on Srinagar-Leh road.

== See also ==
- List of magnetic hills in India
- Geography of Ladakh
- Tourism in Ladakh
