= Lipovce =

- Municipality
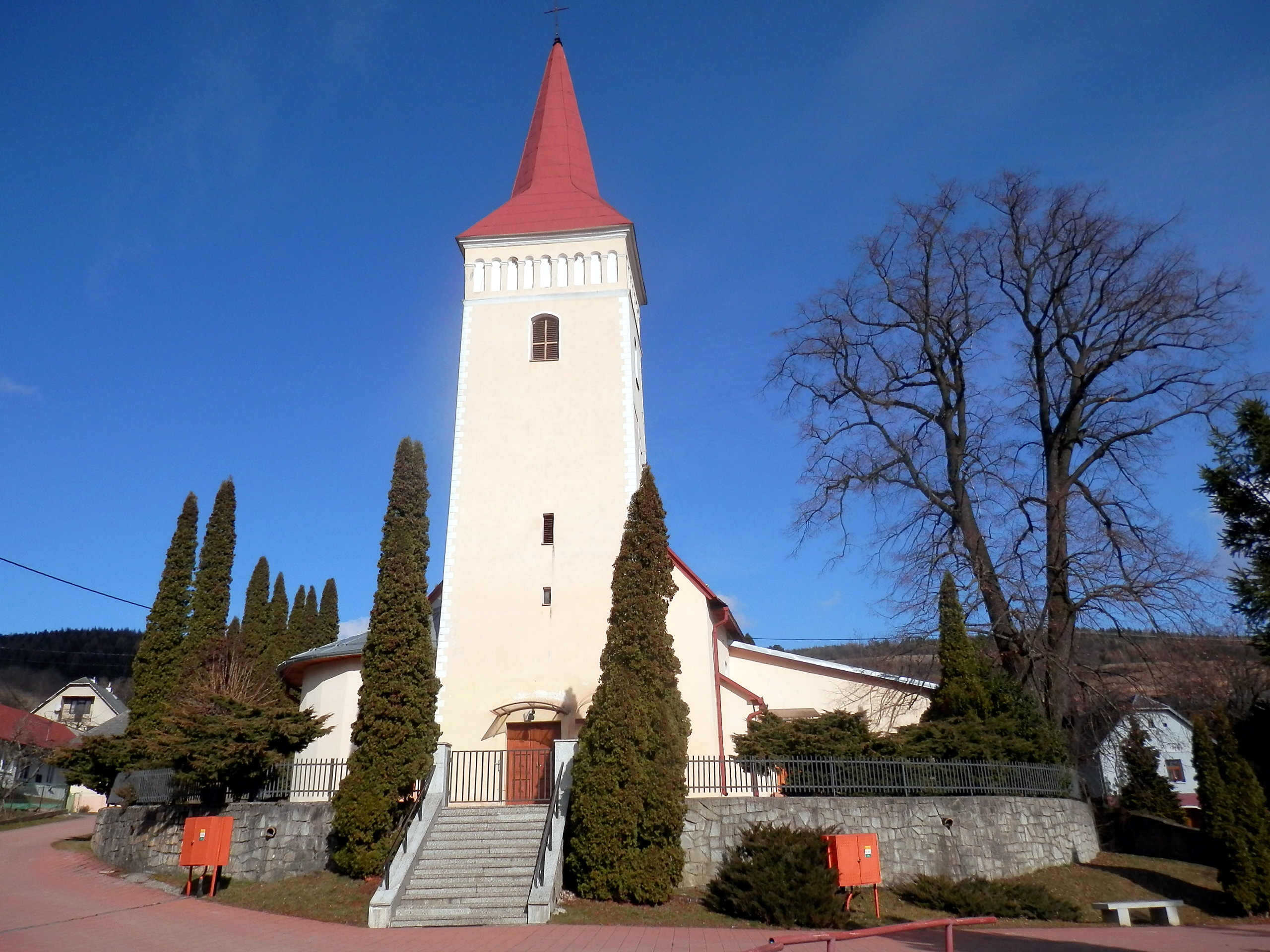

- Flag

- Location of Lipovce in the Prešov Region Location of Lipovce in Slovakia
- Coordinates: 49.05°N 20.95°E
- Country: Slovakia
- Region: Prešov Region
- District: Prešov District
- First mentioned: 1320

Area
  - Total: 22.37 km^{2} (8.64 sq mi)
- Elevation: 622 m (2,041 ft)

Population (2025)
  - Total: 512
- Time zone: UTC+1 (CET)
  - Summer (DST): UTC+2 (CEST)
- Postal code: 823 6
- Area code: +421 51
- Vehicle registration plate (until 2022): PO
- Website: lipovce.eu

Lipovce (Hungarian: Szinyelipóc) is a village and municipality in Prešov District in the Prešov Region of eastern Slovakia.

== History ==
The village was first mentioned in 1320.

== Geography ==
The municipality lies at an altitude of 622 metres (2,041 ft) and covers an area of 22.37 km^{2} (8.64 sq mi) (2025).

== Population ==
Population statistic (10 years)
Year	1995	2005	2015	2025
Count	500	506	513	512
Difference		+1.2%	+1.38%	−0.19%

Population statistic
Year	2024	2025
Count	517	512
Difference		−0.96%

It has a population of 512 people (31 December 2025).

=== Ethnicity ===
Census 2021 (1+ %)
Ethnicity	Number	Fraction
Slovak	487	97.2%
Not found out	12	2.39%
Total	501	

In year 2021 was 501 people by ethnicity 487 as Slovak, 12 as Not found out, 3 as Russian, 1 as Czech, 1 as Rusyn and 1 as Other.

Note on population: The difference values of population numbers in the table "Population statistic" and in the sections "Ethnicity" & "Religion" is caused by the use of various statistical methods.

=== Religion ===
Census 2021 (1+ %)
Religion	Number	Fraction
Roman Catholic Church	428	85.43%
None	40	7.98%
Not found out	14	2.79%
Greek Catholic Church	12	2.4%
Total	501	

In year 2021 was 501 people by religion 428 from Roman Catholic Church, 40 from None, 14 from Not found out, 12 from Greek Catholic Church, 3 from Ad hoc movements, 2 from Evangelical Church, 1 from Other and 1 from Buddhism.
