= Santa Maria in Valle Porclaneta =

Church of Santa Maria in Valle Porclaneta
- Chiesa di Santa Maria in Valle Porclaneta
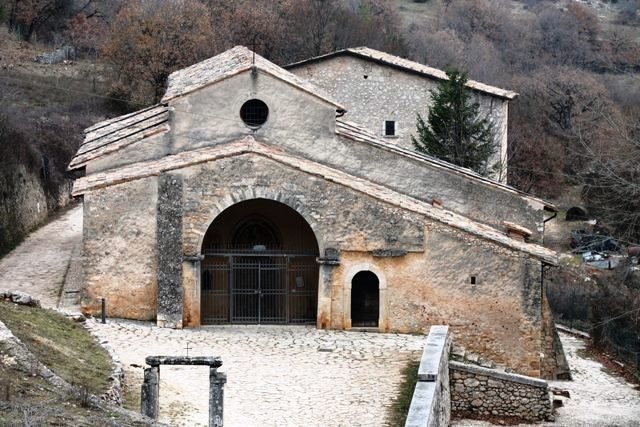
- View of the church

- 42.137271°N 13.336071°E
- Location: Rosciolo dei Marsi (Magliano de' Marsi)
- Country: Italy
- Denomination: Catholic

History
- Status: Church

Architecture
- Functional status: Active
- Style: Romanesque
- Completed: 1048

Administration
- Diocese: Archdiocese of Avezzano

Chiesa di Santa Maria in Valle Porclaneta (Italian for Church of Santa Maria in Valle Porclaneta) is a Romanesque church in Rosciolo dei Marsi (a frazione of the comune of Magliano de' Marsi), in western Abruzzo, central Italy.

== History ==
The church of Santa Maria in Porclaneta Valley is mentioned for the first time in an 11th century document, when the monastery passed under the jurisdiction of the Montecassino Abbey. It is located on the slopes of Monte Velino, at 1022 meters above the sea level.

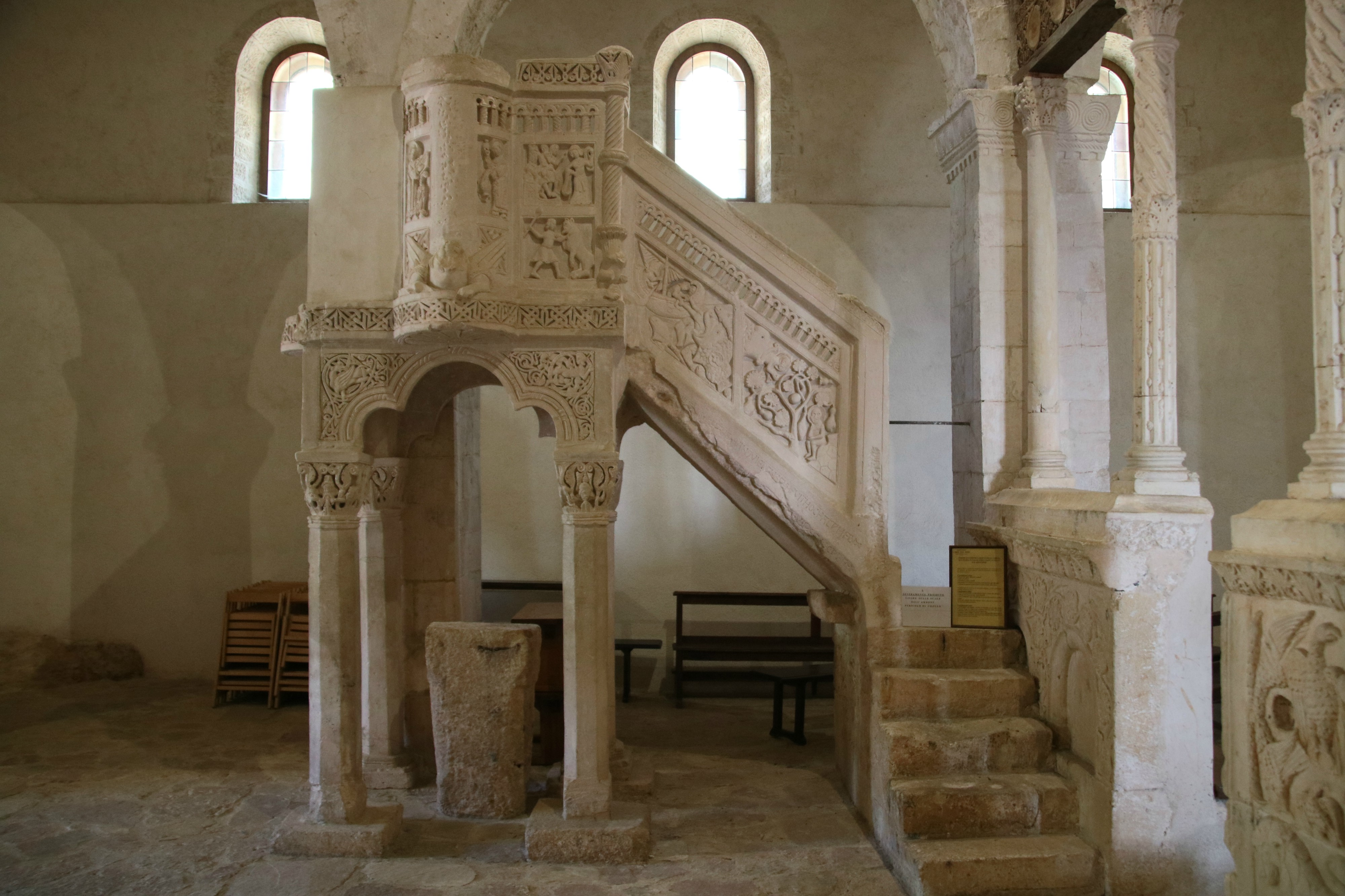
View of the pulpit.

The plan of the church, which is in Romanesque style, consists of a central nave ending in an apse; this is separated by two smaller naves by arcades. Before the entrance is a pronaos, which used to lead to the monks' rooms, now partially collapsed. Inside the church is preserved a ambon and a ciborium dated 1150, both attributed to the master Nicodemus; furthermore, there are the remains of the iconostasis that used to separate the presbytery from the hall reserved to the congregation, painted with frescoes.

The ambon is in stone covered by stucco, with a squared pulpit built over trilobed arches, in turn supported by small octagonal columns. The capitals are decorated with human figures mixed with vegetable representations. The sides of the upper pulpit are in turn sculpted with diacons and scenes from the Old Testament, including David fighting the bear and Jonah devoured by the whale. The decoration is similar to that in the church of Santa Maria del Lago at Moscufo, also in Abruzzo.
