= Gravity hill =

Illusion in which objects appear to roll uphill

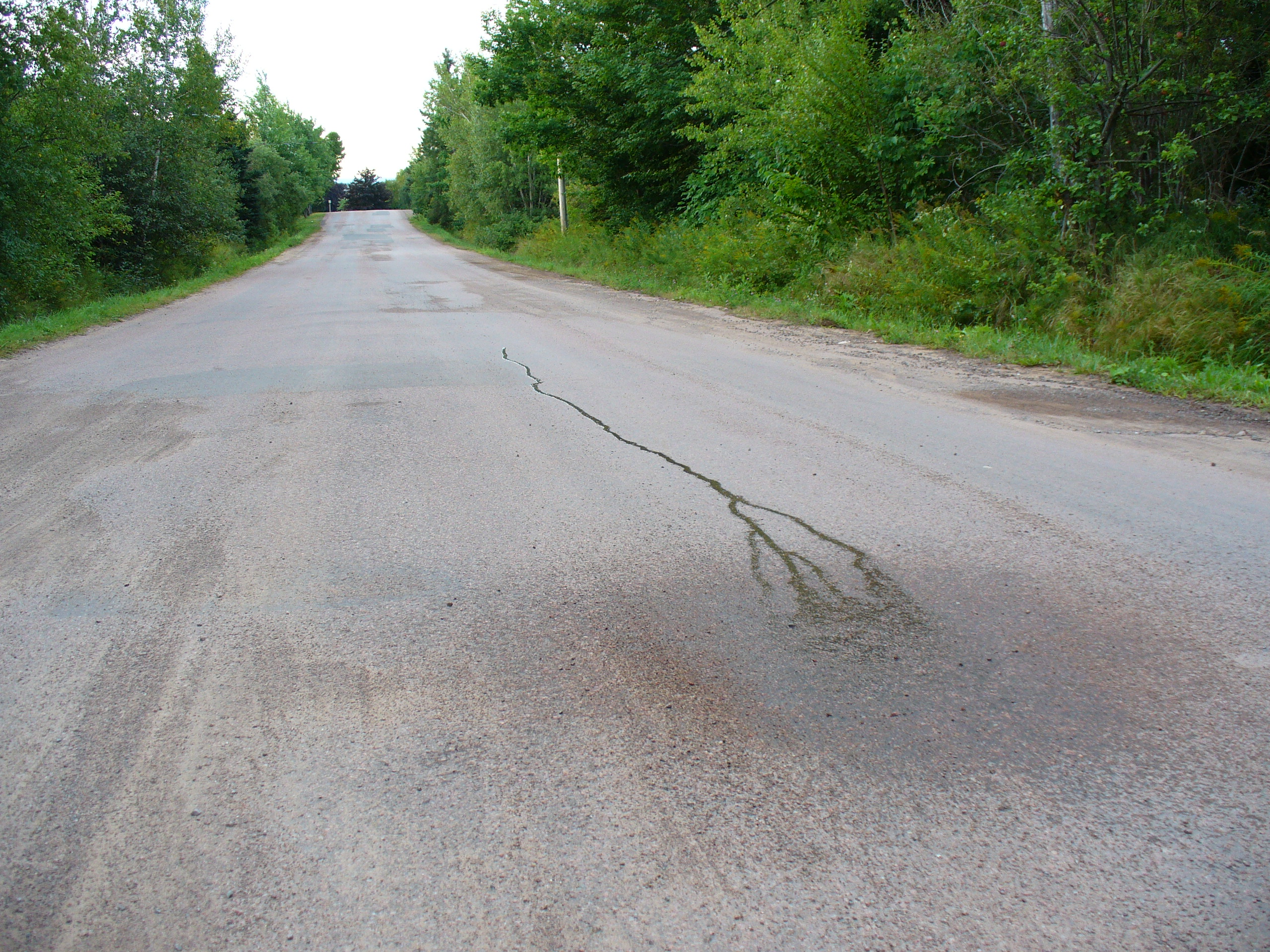
Water appearing to run uphill at Magnetic Hill in New Brunswick

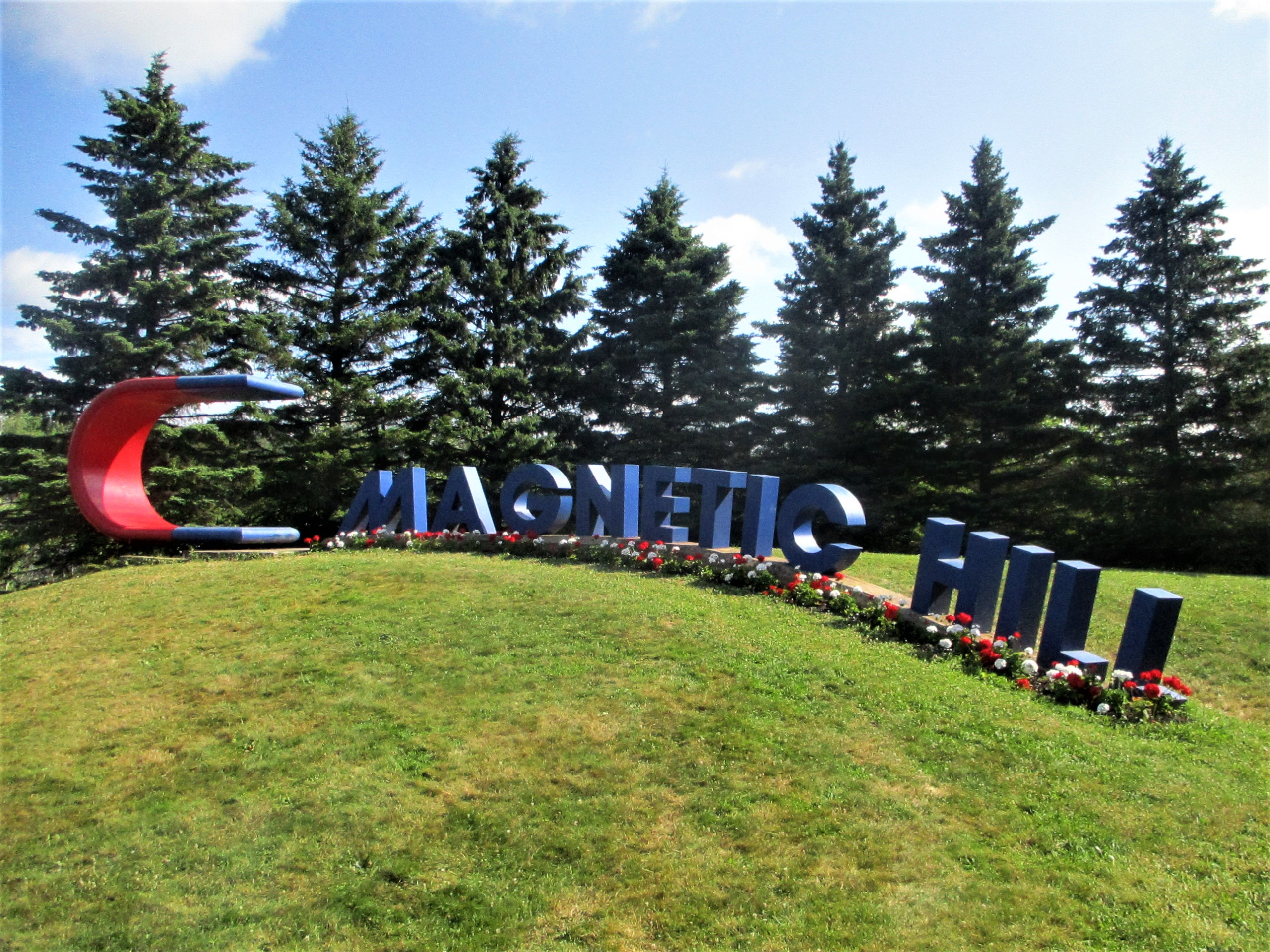
Magnetic Hill in Moncton, New Brunswick

A gravity hill, which can be known by many names including magnetic hill, mystery hill, mystery spot, gravity road and anti-gravity hill, is a place where the layout of the surrounding land produces an illusion, making a slight downhill slope appear to be an uphill slope. Thus, a car left out of gear will appear to be rolling uphill against gravity.

Although the slope of gravity hills is an illusion, sites are often accompanied by claims that magnetic or supernatural forces are at work. The most important factor contributing to the illusion is a completely or mostly obstructed horizon. Without a horizon, it becomes difficult for a person to judge the slope of a surface, as a reliable reference point is missing, and misleading visual cues can adversely affect the sense of balance. Objects which one would normally assume to be more or less perpendicular to the ground, such as trees, may be leaning, offsetting the visual reference.

A 2003 study looked into how the absence of a horizon can skew the perspective on gravity hills, by recreating a number of antigravity places in the lab to see how volunteers would react. In conclusion, researchers from the Universities of Padua and Pavia in Italy found that without a true horizon in sight, the human brain could be tricked by common landmarks such as trees and signs.

The illusion is similar to the Ames room, in which objects can also appear to roll against gravity.

The opposite phenomenon—an uphill road that appears flat—is known in bicycle racing as a "false flat".

== See also ==
- List of gravity hills
