= Donald Reid =

Donald or Don Reid may refer to:

- Donald Reid (politician, born 1833) (1833–1919), New Zealand politician, represented Taieri electorate 1866–69 and 1871–78
- Donald Reid (politician, born 1850) (1850–1922), New Zealand politician, represented Bruce electorate 1885–87
- Donald Reid (politician, born 1855) (1855–1920), New Zealand politician, represented Taieri electorate 1902–08
- Don B. Reid (1926–2001), mayor of Ottawa, Canada
- Donald Lees Reid (born 1951), Scottish author
- Don Reid (singer) (born 1945), lead vocalist and songwriter of The Statler Brothers
- Don Reid (basketball) (born 1973), American basketball player
- Donald Reid (epidemiologist) (1914–1977), Scottish epidemiologist after whom the Donald Reid Medal is named
- Don Reid, playwright, Codgers

== See also ==
- Donald Reid Medal, named after the British epidemiologist Donald Reid (died 1977)
- Donald Reid Cabral (1923–2006), Dominican military commander and Triumvirate leader
- Donald Reed (disambiguation)
- Donal Reid (born early 1960s), Gaelic footballer
- Don Read (1933–2024), American football coach
- Donald Read, British historian
- J. Don Read (born 1943), Canadian psychologist
- Donna Reed (1921–1986), American actress
