= Dalmellington railway station =

Disused railway station in Dalmellington, East Ayrshire

Dalmellington
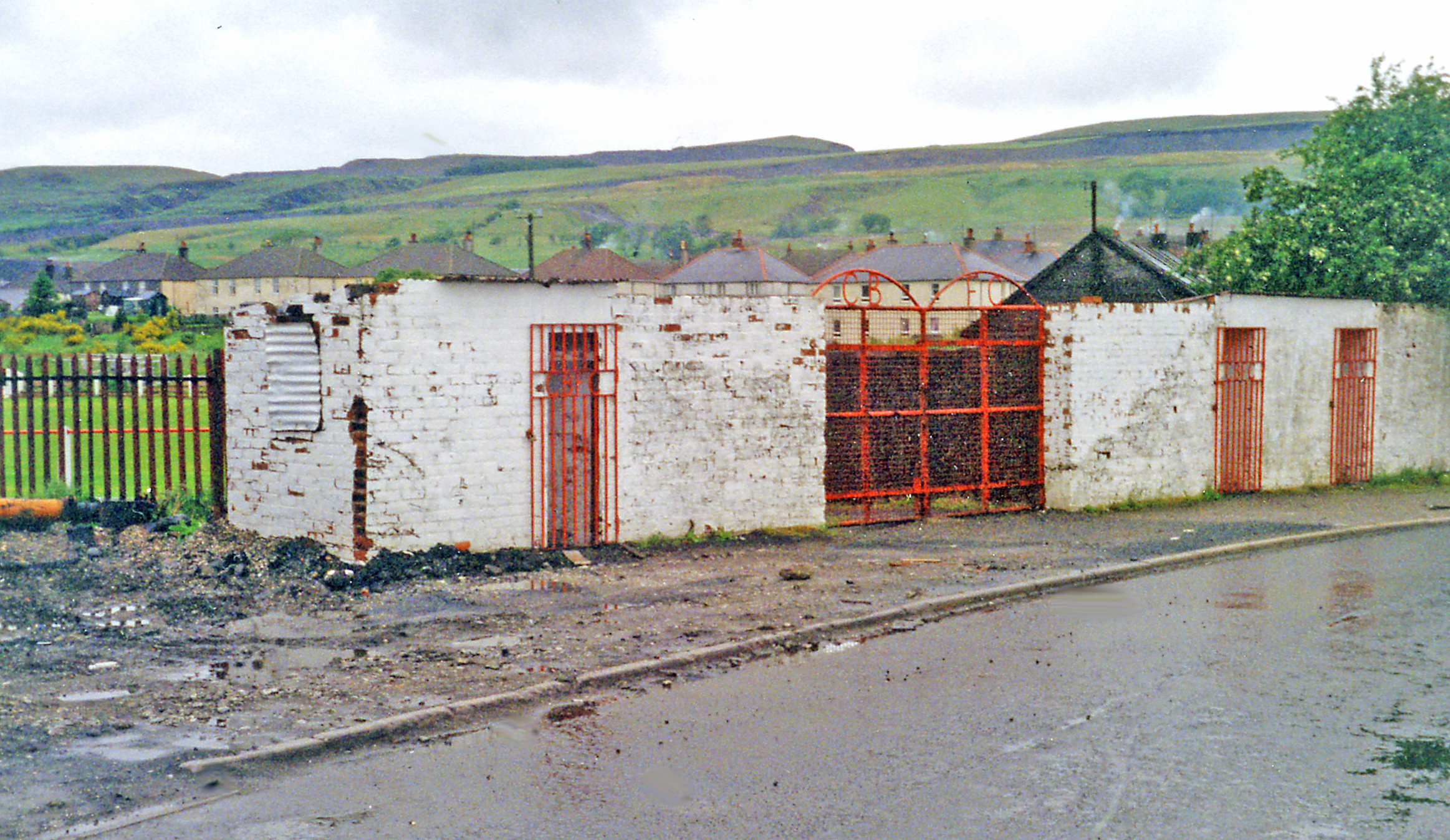
- The site of the station in 1994

General information
- Location: Dalmellington, East Ayrshire; Scotland
- Coordinates: 55.3233°N 4.3999°W
- Grid reference: NS478058
- Platforms: 1

Other information
- Status: Disused

History
- Original company: Glasgow and South Western Railway
- Pre-grouping: Glasgow and South Western Railway
- Post-grouping: London, Midland and Scottish Railway; British Railways (Scottish Region)

Key dates
- 7 August 1856: Opened
- 6 April 1964: Closed
Location

Dalmellington railway station served the town of Dalmellington, East Ayrshire, Scotland, from 1856 to 1964 on the Ayr and Dalmellington Railway.

== History ==
The station was opened on 7 August 1856 by the Glasgow and South Western Railway. On the west side was the goods yard, to the east was the locomotive shed and on the east side was the signal box, which opened in 1884. The station closed on 6 April 1964.

The Loch Doon Aerial Gunnery School Railway ran from near the station and crossed the Ayr Road and Muck Water to reach a terminus at Dalfarson near Loch Doon.

Preceding station	Disused railways	Following station
Waterside; Line open, station closed	Glasgow and South Western Railway; Ayr and Dalmellington Railway	Terminus
