= Hollybush railway station =

Former railway station in Scotland

Hollybush
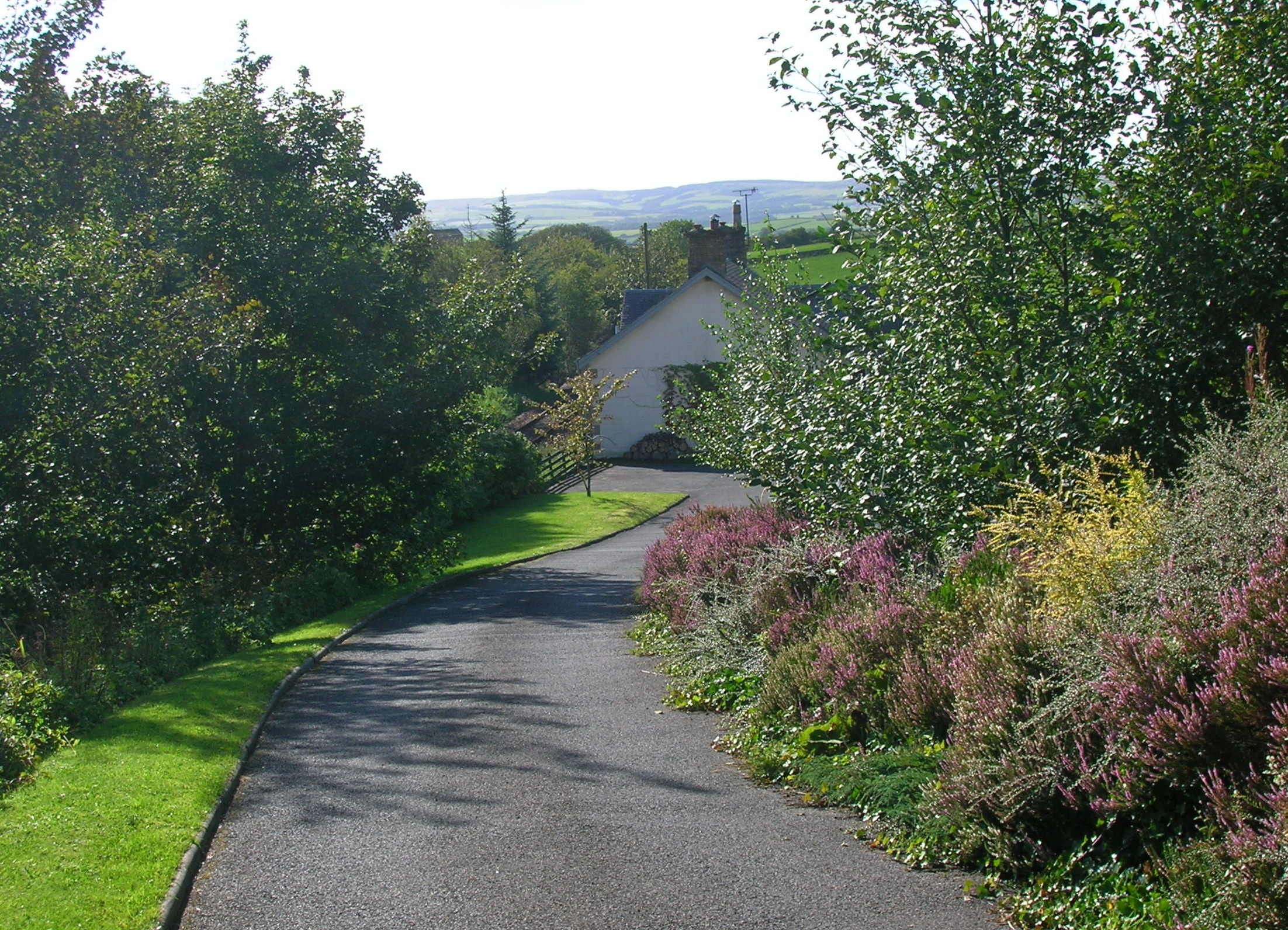
- The site of the station in 2011

General information
- Location: East Ayrshire, Ayrshire; Scotland
- Coordinates: 55.4012°N 4.5405°W
- Grid reference: NS3893214912
- Platforms: 1

Other information
- Status: Disused

History
- Original company: Ayr and Dalmellington Railway
- Pre-grouping: Glasgow and South Western Railway
- Post-grouping: London, Midland and Scottish Railway

Key dates
- 7 August 1856: Station opened
- 6 April 1964: Station closed
Location

Hollybush railway station was a railway station in East Ayrshire, Scotland that served the nearby Hollybush Hotel and the rural district. The line on which the old station stands was originally part of the Ayr and Dalmellington Railway, worked and later owned by the Glasgow and South Western Railway. The station, opened as Hollybush later became part of the London, Midland and Scottish Railway and was closed by the British Railways Board (BRB).

== History ==
The Ayr and Dalmellington Railway began as the Ayrshire and Galloway (Smithstown & Dalmellington) Railway, with its enabling legislation (Note: Ayrshire and Galloway (Smithstown and Dalmellington) Railway Act 1847 (10 & 11 Vict. c. x)) receiving royal assent on 8 June 1847. The branch line was planned to run between Waterside and Sillyhole near Dalmellington, however the company evolved into the Ayr and Dalmellington Railway, with further legislation receiving royal assent on 4 August 1853 (Note: Ayr and Dalmellington Railway Act 1853 (16 & 17 Vict. c. cxlviii)) to allow the tracks to be extended to both Ayr and Dalmellington.

In 1856 the station had a single building and one siding, approached down a lane that ran from the Malcomston Bridge. The 1894 OS shows a larger station building complex, several sidings, a loading dock, goods shed, railway cottages and an access off the side road. In 1908 a weigh machine was present, a signal box close to the overbridge and a crane near the railway cottages. By 1971 the sidings had been lifted and the nearby school off the B7034 was closed.

The majority of the line is still open today (datum 2013) for freight trains serving opencast mining sites in the area.

The station house survives as a private dwelling lying just off the A713 Ayr, however the old platform has been demolished.

== Micro-history ==
The evergreen holly Ilex aquifolium plant has been used a pub sign since Roman times and thus became a popular name for inns such as the one that Hollybush station is named from.

== Notes ==
Preceding station	Historical railways	Following station
Maybole Junction; Line open; station closed	Glasgow and South Western Railway; Ayr and Dalmellington Railway	Holehouse Junction; Line open; station closed
