= Polnessan =

Coordinates: 55°22′30″N 4°29′48″W

Polnessan: Scottish Gaelic: Poll an Easain
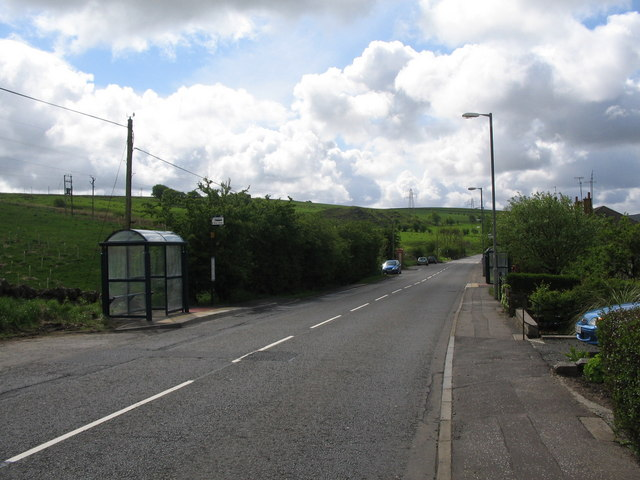
- The A713 at Polnessan

- Location within East Ayrshire
- Population: 87
- OS grid reference: NS 4192 1170
- Council area: East Ayrshire
- Lieutenancy area: East Ayrshire
- Country: Scotland
- Sovereign state: United Kingdom
- Post town: AYR
- Postcode district: KA6
- Police: Scotland
- Fire: Scottish
- Ambulance: Scottish
- UK Parliament: Ayr, Carrick and Cumnock
- Scottish Parliament: Carrick, Cumnock and Doon Valley

Polnessan (Scottish Gaelic: Poll an Easain, pool on the small waterfall) is a small rural village in East Ayrshire, Scotland. Polnessan has a population of 87, and is located a mile north of Patna on the A713 road.

Polnessan has no facilities, and is effectively a long row of council housing. The houses were originally built by Ayr County Council for miners and their families on the Houldsworth pit, a nearby coal mine first sunk by Dalmellington Iron Company in 1900.

There are bus services to Ayr and Dalmellington regularly from Polnessan, run by the Stagecoach bus company, as well as postal facilities.
