= Patna railway station (Scotland) =

Former railway station in Scotland

Patna

General information
- Location: Patna, East Ayrshire, Ayrshire; Scotland
- Coordinates: 55.3662°N 4.4994°W
- Grid reference: NS4168610877
- Platforms: 1

Other information
- Status: Disused

History
- Original company: Glasgow and South Western Railway
- Pre-grouping: Glasgow and South Western Railway
- Post-grouping: London, Midland and Scottish Railway; British Railways (Scottish Region)

Key dates
- 7 August 1856: first station opened
- 1897: resited
- 6 April 1964: closed
Location

Patna railway station was a railway station serving Patna, East Ayrshire, Scotland. The station was originally part of the Ayr and Dalmellington Railway, worked and later owned by the Glasgow and South Western Railway.

== History ==
The first station opened on 7 August 1856 and in 1897 was resited around 150 metres (490 ft) south from the original station site. The second station's site was closed by the British Railways Board in 1964.

The station had a single platform, a signal box near the road overbridge, a few sidings and a goods shed. The platform has been demolished and a private dwelling is now located at the site of the old station building.

Preceding station	Historical railways	Following station
Holehouse Junction; Line open, station closed	London, Midland and Scottish Railway; Dalmellington Branch	Waterside; Line open, station closed
