= Waterside railway station =

Disused railway station in Waterside, East Ayrshire

Waterside

General information
- Location: Waterside, East Ayrshire; Scotland
- Coordinates: 55.3467°N 4.4661°W
- Grid reference: NS437086
- Platforms: 1

Other information
- Status: Disused

History
- Original company: Glasgow and South Western Railway
- Pre-grouping: Glasgow and South Western Railway
- Post-grouping: London, Midland and Scottish Railway; British Railways (Scottish Region)

Key dates
- 7 August 1856: Opened
- 6 April 1964: Closed
Location

Waterside railway station served the village of Waterside, East Ayrshire, Scotland, from 1856 to 1964 on the Ayr and Dalmellington Railway.

== History ==
The station was opened on 7 August 1856 by the Glasgow and South Western Railway. To the south was the goods yard and at the south end of the platform was the signal box, which opened in 1893. To the north was a siding which served Dalmellington Iron Works to the northwest. It closed in 1921 but the private railway continued to keep the site in operation. The station closed on 6 April 1964.

| Preceding station | Disused railways | Following station |
|---|---|---|
| Patna; Line open, station closed | Glasgow and South Western Railway; Ayr and Dalmellington Railway | Dalmellington; Line and station closed |
