= Maybole Junction railway station =

Former railway station in Scotland

Maybole Junction

General information
- Location: Near Dalrymple, Ayrshire; Scotland
- Coordinates: 55.4174°N 4.5969°W

Other information
- Status: Disused

History
- Original company: Ayr and Dalmellington Railway
- Pre-grouping: Glasgow and South Western Railway

Key dates
- 13 October 1856: opened
- 1 December 1859: closed
Location

Maybole Junction railway station was a railway station located between Alloway and Dalrymple in South Ayrshire, Scotland. The station was originally part of the Ayr and Dalmellington Railway (worked and later owned by the Glasgow and South Western Railway).

== History ==
The station opened on 13 October 1856, and closed 1 December 1859. Remained open for goods traffic only for many years afterwards when it was renamed Dalrymple Junction.

Preceding station	Historical railways	Following station
Dalrymple; Line open, station closed	Glasgow and South Western Railway; Ayr and Maybole Junction Railway	Ayr; Line and station open
Hollybush; Line and station closed	Glasgow and South Western Railway; Ayr and Dalmellington Railway	Ayr; Line and station open
