= David Campbell (pharmacologist) =

Scottish physician and pharmacologist

Campbell in 1953.

Sir David Campbell MC FRSE (6 May 1889 – 30 May 1978) was a Scottish physician and pharmacologist. He was Professor of Materia Medica at Aberdeen University from 1930 to 1959. He won the Military Cross in 1918 due to his bravery serving in the Royal Army Medical Corps.

== Life ==
He was born in Patna, East Ayrshire in south-west Scotland on 6 May 1889, the son of Agnes Smith Campbell, a seamstress. His father, Stewart Campbell, was a teacher, but died either before David was born or soon after, leaving the family in difficult financial circumstances. However, David’s brilliant mind compensated for other factors.

He won a scholarship to Ayr Academy and then won a further scholarship to Glasgow University to study Mathematics and Physics. He qualified MA and BSc in 1911. He then decided to continue in studies, and studied Medicine and Pharmacology, still at Glasgow University, qualifying MB ChB in 1916.

His medical career was interrupted by the First World War. He joined the Royal Army Medical Corps in 1916 and won the Military Cross in 1918 whilst serving in northern France as an Acting Major. He was discharged in 1919.

He returned to act as an assistant to Prof Ralph Stockman at Glasgow University and in 1921 became the Pollok Lecturer in Materia Medica and Pharmacology. He also worked at the Glasgow Western Infirmary as a physician from this time until 1929 (with various breaks for studies). He qualified MD in 1924. His final thesis, on rheumatoid arthritis, earned him the coveted Bellahouston Gold Medal. In 1925 he travelled to the United States as a Rockefeller Medical Fellow at Johns Hopkins University.

In 1930 he received the chair as professor of materia medica at Aberdeen University and relocated. Here he made huge advances in the Aberdeen centre for medical research at Foresterhill, and was elevated to dean of faculty in 1932.

In 1949 he was elected president of the General Medical Council for all of UK. He was also chairman of the disciplinary committee covering medical malpractice. In 1950 he received a staggering five honorary doctorates: LLD from Glasgow University, Liverpool University, Dublin University and Aberdeen University; and a DCL from Durham University. In 1951 he was elected a Fellow of the Royal Society of Edinburgh. He was knighted in the 1953 Coronation Honours List.

He retired to Peterculter west of Aberdeen in 1961. He continued personal research but also enjoyed both golf and billiards. He died there at home, 252 North Deeside Road on 30 May 1978.

== Family ==
He married Margaret Lyle in 1921. They had no children.

== Artistic recognition ==
- Sir David was painted by Charles Hemingway in 1959. The portrait is held by Aberdeen University
- A 1953 bromide print by Walter Stoneman is held by the National Portrait Gallery in London.
- A further portrait by A. Morocco hangs in the Council Chamber of the General Medical Council.

== Publications ==
See

- A Handbook of Therapeutics (1928)
