= Robert Hetrick =

Scottish poet and blacksmith

Robert Hetrick (c. 1769–1849) was a poet and blacksmith from Dalmellington, Ayrshire, Scotland. He was known for his patriotic verses written against Napoleon. He published one book, Poems and Songs of Robert Hetrick, in 1826.
