= Cassillis railway station =

Former railway station in Scotland

Cassillis
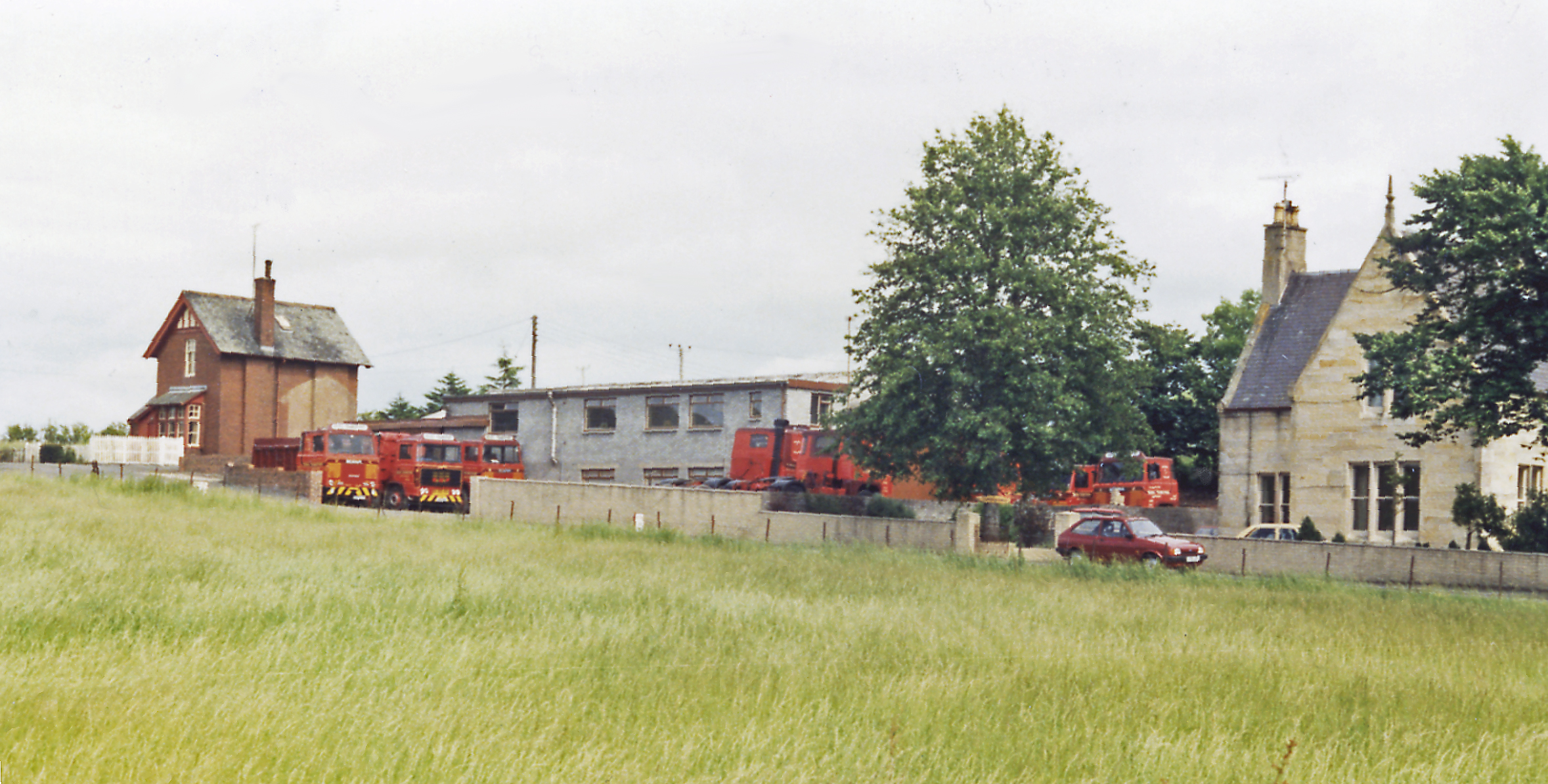
- Remains of the station in 1986

General information
- Location: Minishant, Ayrshire; Scotland
- Coordinates: 55.3839°N 4.6397°W
- Grid reference: NS328131
- Platforms: 2

Other information
- Status: Disused

History
- Original company: Ayr and Maybole Junction Railway
- Pre-grouping: Glasgow and South Western Railway
- Post-grouping: London, Midland and Scottish Railway

Key dates
- 13 October 1856: Opened
- 6 December 1954: Closed
Location

Cassillis railway station was a railway station serving the village of Minishant, South Ayrshire, Scotland. The station was originally part of the Ayr and Maybole Junction Railway (and later the Glasgow and South Western Railway).

== History ==
The station opened on 13 October 1856, and closed 6 December 1954.

The station was named after nearby Cassillis House, and consisted of two side platforms and a moderate sized station building. Since closure both platforms have been removed (and the line singled), however the station building remains intact as a private residence.

Preceding station	Historical railways	Following station
Maybole; Line and station open	Glasgow and South Western Railway; Ayr and Maybole Junction Railway	Dalrymple; Line open, station closed
Maybole (old) (1856-1860); Line and station closed	Glasgow and South Western Railway; Ayr and Maybole Junction Railway	Dalrymple; Line open, station closed
