= Maybole railway station (1856–1860) =

Disused railway station in Ayrshire, Scotland

Maybole

General information
- Location: Maybole, Ayrshire; Scotland
- Coordinates: 55.3585°N 4.6747°W
- Grid reference: NS305104
- Platforms: 2

Other information
- Status: Disused

History
- Original company: Ayr and Maybole Junction Railway
- Pre-grouping: Glasgow and South Western Railway

Key dates
- 13 October 1856: Opened
- 24 May 1860: Closed
Location

Maybole railway station was a railway station serving the village of Maybole, South Ayrshire, Scotland. The station was originally part of the Ayr and Maybole Junction Railway (worked and later owned by the Glasgow and South Western Railway).

== History ==
The station opened on 13 October 1856, and closed on 24 May 1860 when a new station with the same name opened to the south west on the Maybole and Girvan Railway.

The station was used as a goods station after closure to passengers.

Preceding station	Historical railways	Following station
Terminus	Glasgow and South Western Railway; Ayr and Maybole Junction Railway	Cassillis; Line open, station closed
