= Loch Doon Aerial Gunnery School Railway =

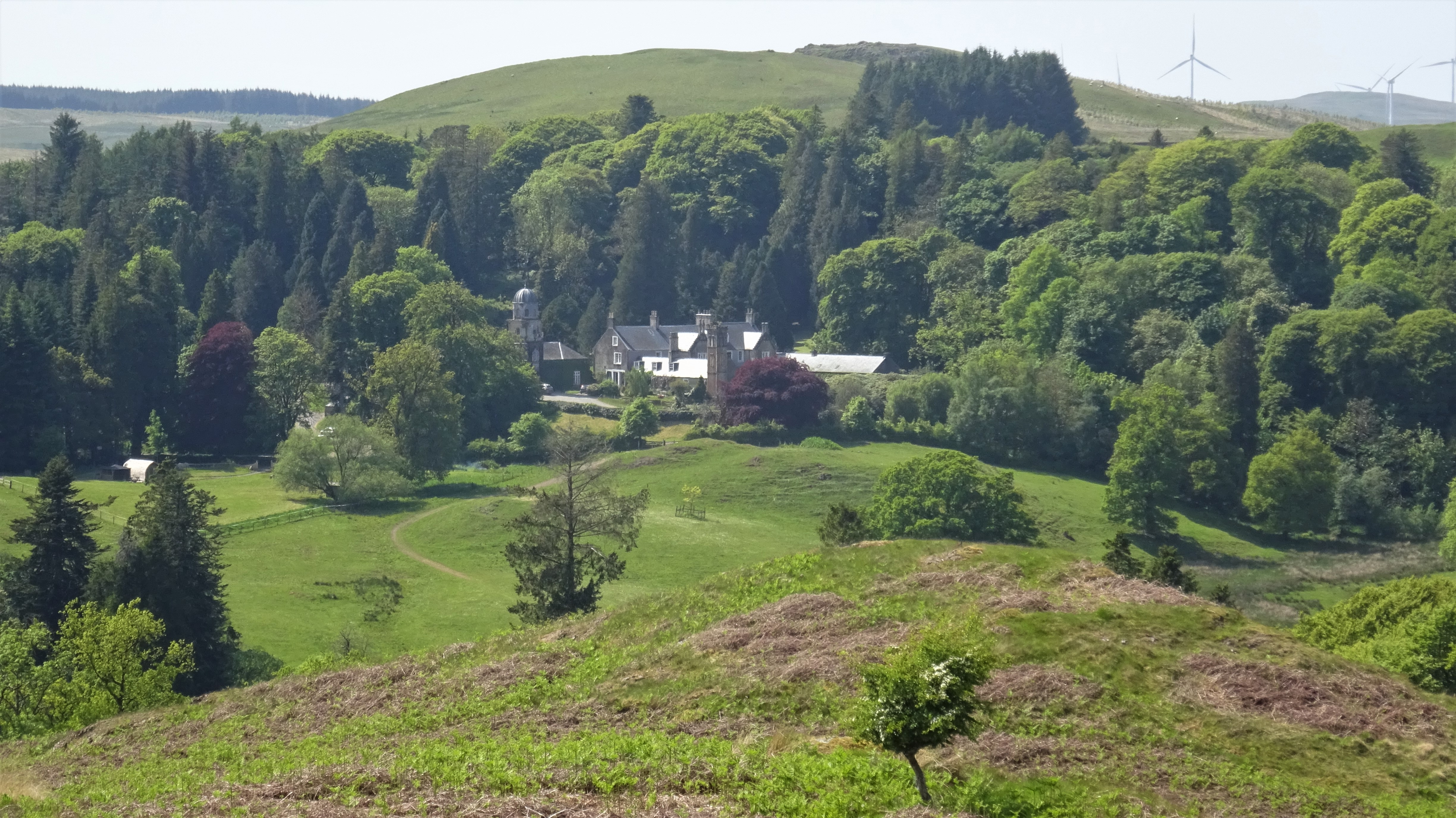
- The site of the Dalfarson terminus

Overview
- Locale: Dalmellington, East Ayrshire
- Dates of operation: April 1917–January 1918
- Successor: Abandoned and lifted

Technical
- Track gauge: Standard
- Length: 1.25 miles (2.01 km)

The Loch Doon Aerial Gunnery School Railway was a standard gauge military freight carrying line that ran the 1.4 miles (2 km) from a junction with the Ayr and Dalmellington Railway near Dalmellington to a terminus at Dalfarson on the Craigengillan Estate, East Ayrshire. No passenger carriages are recorded.

== History ==
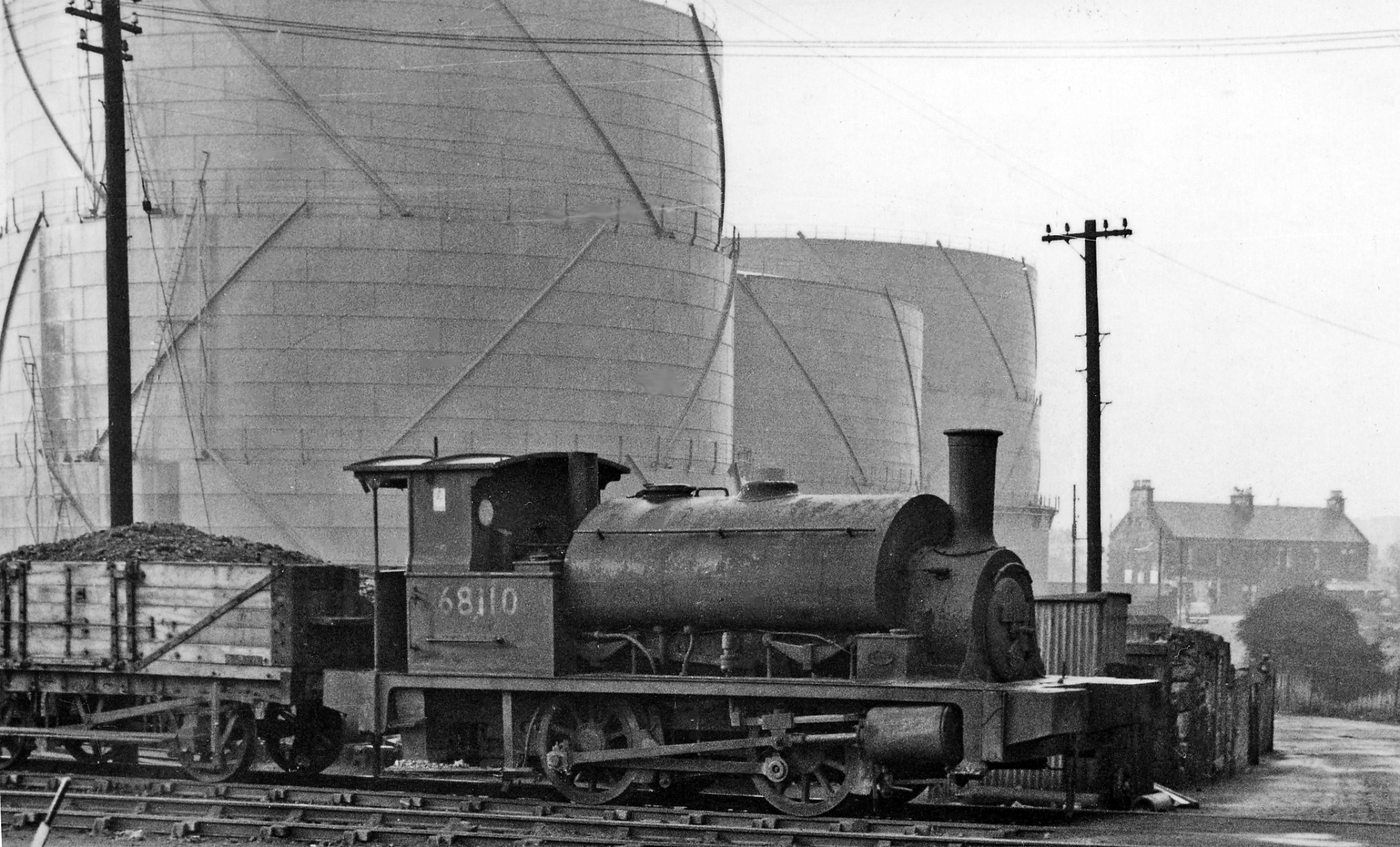
A 'Pug' locomotive. One is shown working in a photograph working on the line

The line was built for the Royal Flying Corps to facilitate the movement of building materials, stores, possibly workers, etc. to the Aerial Gunnery School site at Loch Doon and the airfield at Bogton (NS474059) near Dalmellington. Members of the Royal Defence Corps and the McAlpine's workers travelled in to Loch Doon daily from Ayr by train.

The line had its terminus at the Dalfarson platform near Craigengillan House below Loch Doon. The proposed 1,150 foot or 350 metre tunnel to take the railway to the lochside was never built and the plan for its construction at a cost of £150,000 led to an analysis by the Director of Fortifications and Works that ultimately resulted in the cancellation of the entire gunnery school scheme.

The terminus of the railway at Dalfarson was at a short platform around 1km north of the shore of the loch and therefore materials and workers, etc. therefore travelled the remaining 1.2km distance to the loch by road or on foot.

The railway had delivered a maximum of 150 tons of materials to the railhead a day. Various crated boats and planes were transported on the line to the terminus or to Bogton Airfield.

A total of twenty-two railwaymen were employed for maintenance and one to control the level crossing at the Ayr Road.

On 1 October 1917, Prince Arthur, the Duke of Connaught, inspected the scheme. He was a son of Queen Victoria.

== Construction ==
On 4 March 1917 McAlpine's started the construction of a railway spur to the Bogton Airfield site and in less than a fortnight a six-wheeled van was brought by rail to the site hauled by the contractors No.9 locomotive, previously the 1898 Hudswell Clarke No.492. On 9 April the contractors began to extend the railway as a result of the very poor condition of the roads. This line was completed through to the terminus at Dalfarson by 20 April. Mrs McAdam of the Craigengillan Estate had opposed its construction to no avail. It was worked the larger locomotive, Hudswell Clarke, previously No.1011, of 1912. This had been delivered to Dalmellington on a well-wagon on 27 April. This was a design of low-floored wagon designed for carrying vehicles, etc. that would be over the recommended height of a normal flatbed wagon and would exceed the loading gauge.

== Infrastructure ==
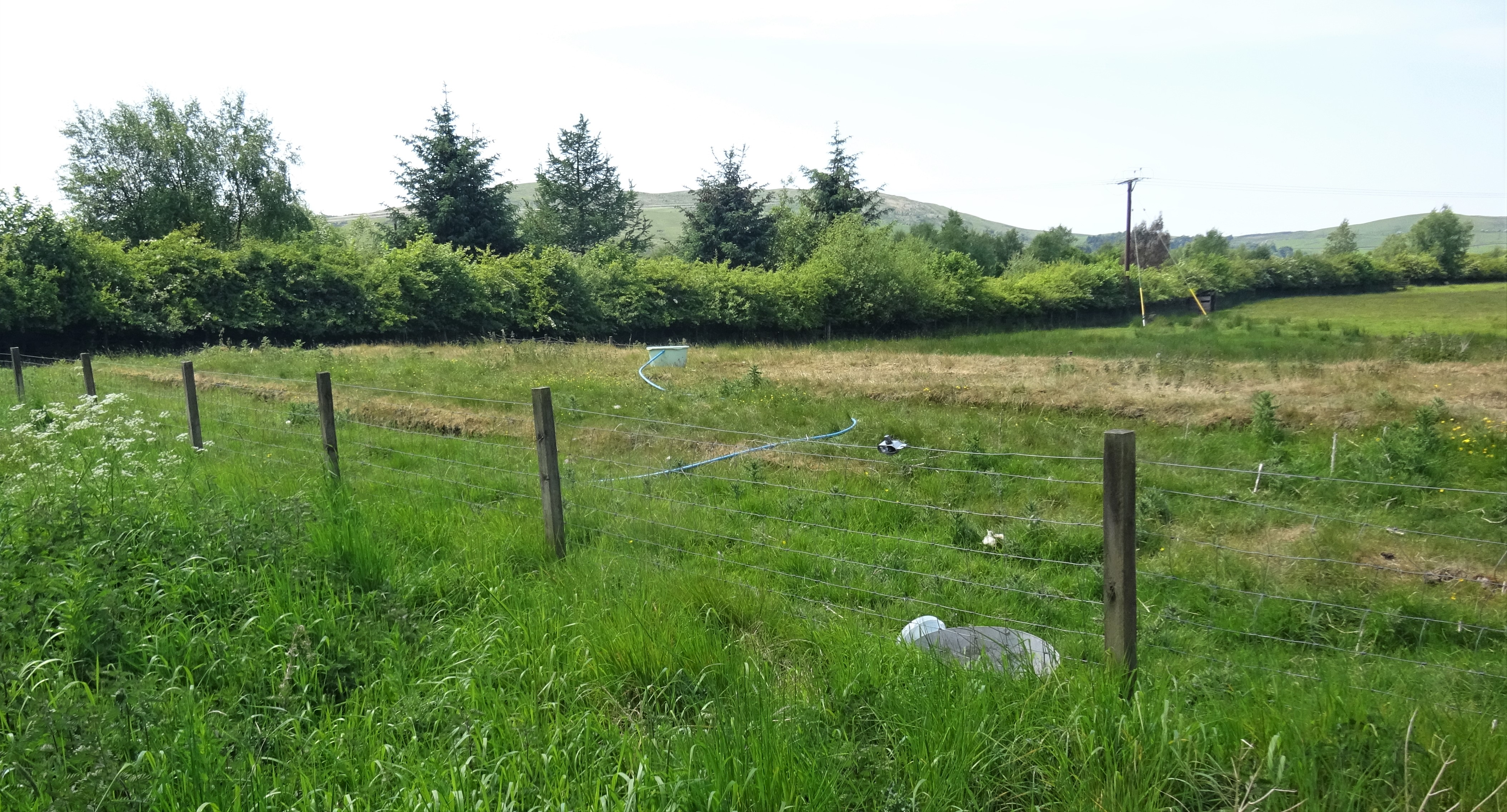
Bogton Airfield and railway loading dock

The line was standard gauge and branched off the Dalmellington line about 200 metres northwest of Dalmellington railway station, crossed Ayr Road, crossed the Muck Water by a bridge (NS474059) and then ran parallel to the Craigengillan driveway before turning south-east and running up to near Dalfarson (NS479025) where a 5 metre long platform was built, together with a water tower and coaling dock for the steam locomotives. The track was single with sidings serving the Bogton Airfield and its loading dock (NS474059) and probably further sidings at Dalfarson. A photograph shows a 'Pug', probably the contractor's locomotive, working on the line at the Bogton Airfield siding. The line was circa 1.4 miles or 2.01km in length.

A letter written on 7 January 1918 by the Air Board however stated that the railway had actually been built on the Craigengillan driveway itself and its removal would be straightforward. It is recorded that a private road had been requisitioned and this may have been for the railway.

=== Other railways at the site ===
A monorail was built along a section of the east bank of the loch as witnessed by the row of large concrete blocks that are still present and visible when the water is low. Sections of narrow gauge railway were laid down at the loch however they saw little use.

== Preservation ==
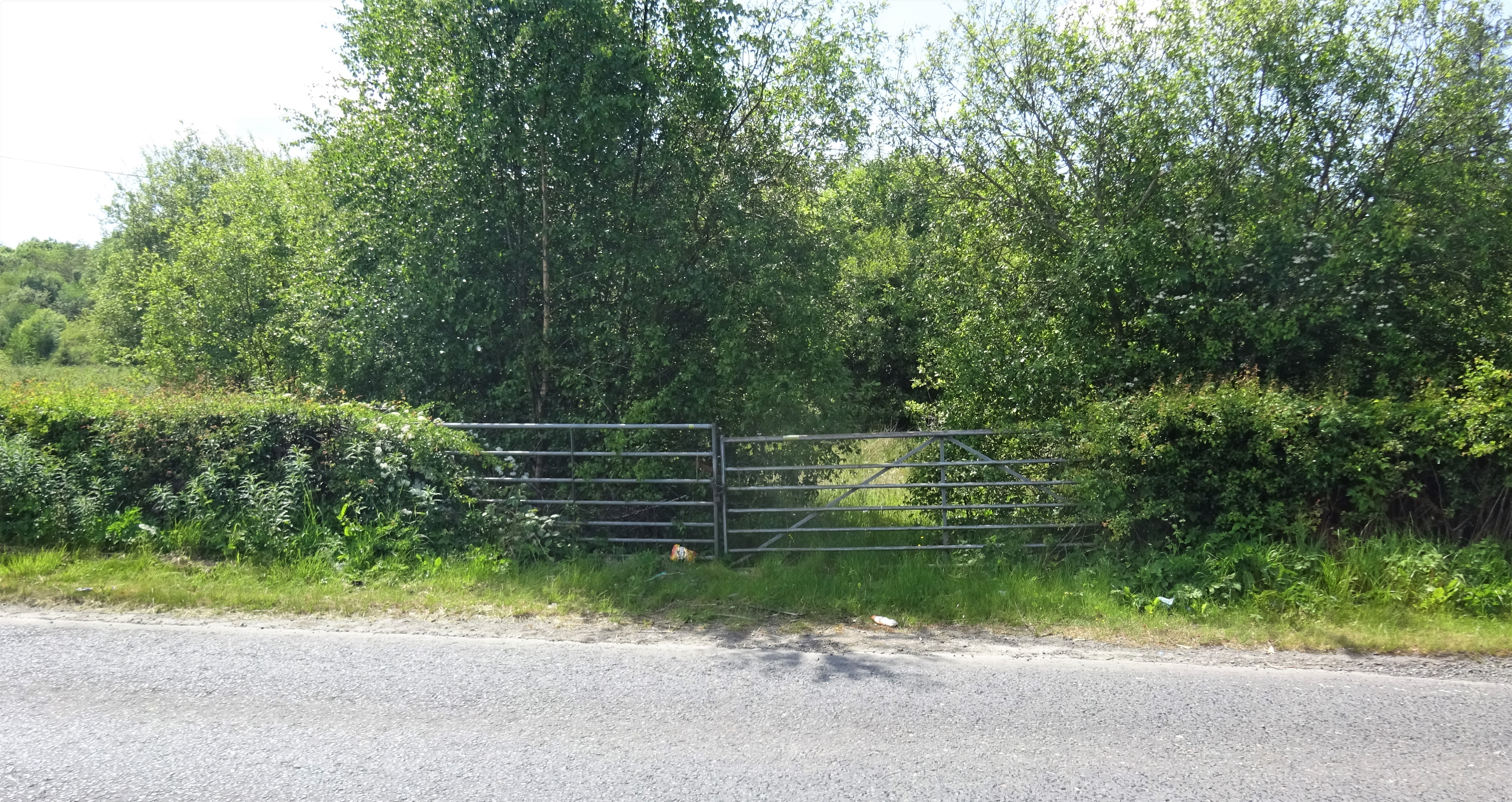
Old level crossing site

It is not known when the railway was lifted, however it is on record that the scheme was simply abandoned until at a date well after the end of the war when it was discovered that the agreement with land owners was that the site should be returned to its original condition.

A Loading dock remains at the Bogton Airfield site where a siding once existed. The trackbed is indistinct en route to Dalfarson however occasional culverts indicate the course of the old railway. At Dalfarson a short platform was still present in 2013 and the foundations of buildings were visible.

The line does not seem to appear on any standard OS Map, partly because it was a military line and because of its short operational life.
