= Patna, East Ayrshire =

Coordinates: 55.3636°N 4.5021°W

Patna
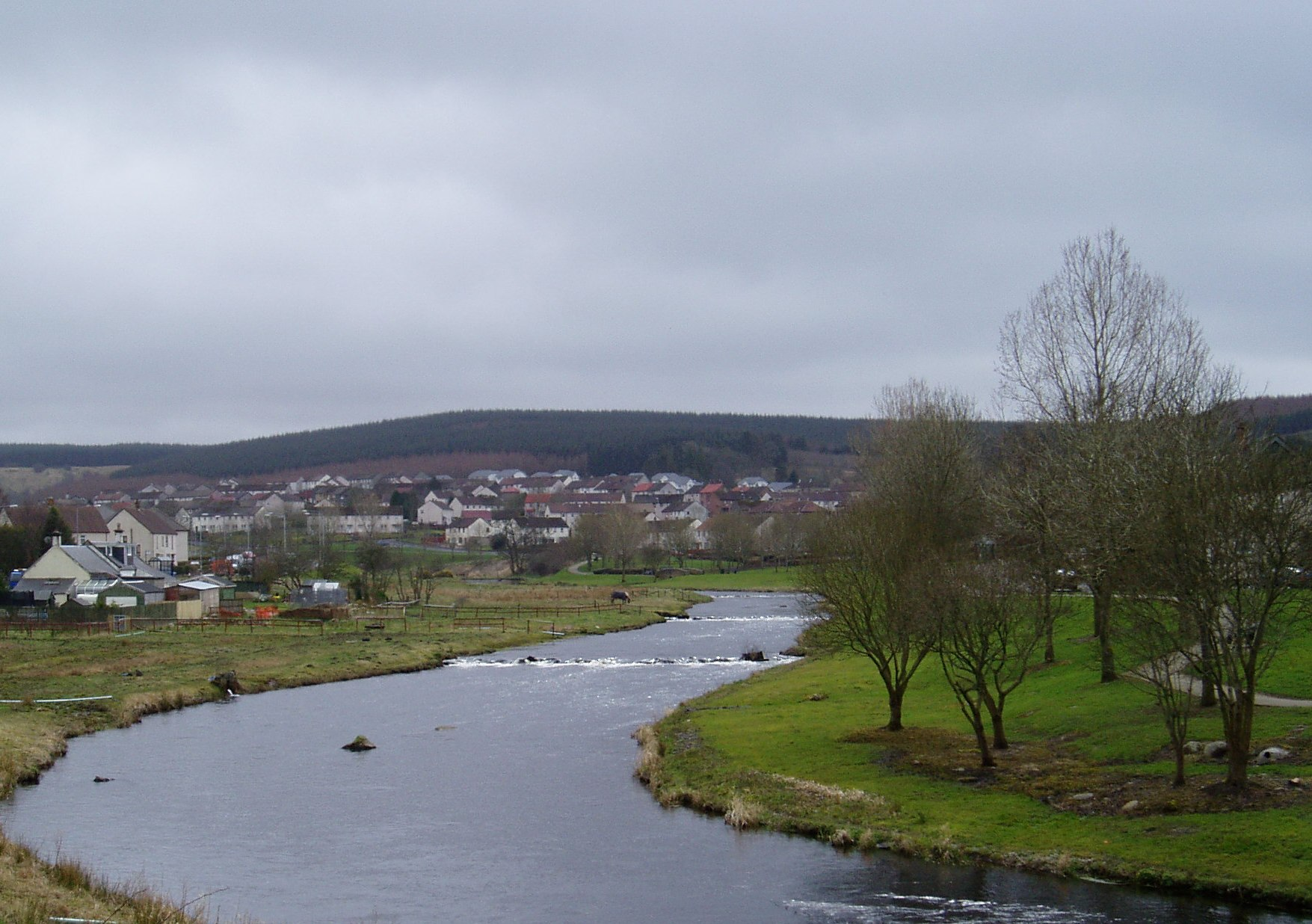
- The River Doon flowing through Patna

- Location within East Ayrshire
- Population: 2,070 (2020)
- OS grid reference: NS 416 106
- Council area: East Ayrshire
- Lieutenancy area: Ayrshire and Arran
- Country: Scotland
- Sovereign state: United Kingdom
- Post town: AYR
- Postcode district: KA6
- Police: Scotland
- Fire: Scottish
- Ambulance: Scottish
- UK Parliament: Ayr, Carrick and Cumnock
- Scottish Parliament: Carrick, Cumnock and Doon Valley

Patna is a village in East Ayrshire, Scotland, straddling the traditional districts of Carrick and Kyle.

== History ==
It was established in 1802 by William Fullarton of Skeldon to provide housing for workers on the coalfields of his estate. Fullarton's father had worked as an employee of the British East India Company, and the town is named after the city of Patna in the Bihar state of India. Patna lies southeast of Ayr on the A713 to Castle Douglas at its junction with the road to Kirkmichael just north of Dalmellington. Patna lies between the villages of Polnessan and Waterside, and the River Doon flows through it

The Patna Campus was completed in 2012 and hosts Patna Primary School (a non-denominational school. Head Teacher - C. McPhail), St Xavier's Primary School (a Catholic primary school which was formerly located in Waterside but has been moved into Patna, and is also attended by pupils from Dalmellington, Bellsbank, Maybole and surrounding areas. Head Teacher - A. Rooney)

== Landmarks ==
A secondary school, Doon Academy, is located in the nearby village of Dalmellington.

Patna also has a small library and fitness gym and a community centre contained within the Patna Campus, a health centre, some shops, a football field, a bar “The Wheatsheaf Inn”, access to numerous country walks, an orange and masonic lodge and a golf club (although the golf course is now closed). The River Doon is popular with local anglers. There are two bridges within the village, used as vehicle and pedestrian crossing points over the River Doon. These bridges are known locally as the 'ol brig' and 'new brig'.

The village was served until 1964 by Patna railway station. The platforms have been demolished and nothing remains of the station.

== Famous residents ==
- Sir David Campbell MC FRSE (1889-1978) was born and raised in Patna.
