= Donald Lees Reid =

Donald Lees Reid FSA Scot
- Born: Dalmellington
- Occupations: Retired policeman and author
- Spouse: Kathleen
- Parent(s): James Reid and Mary Hose

Donald Lees Reid BA (Hons) FSA Scot is a Scottish author. He specialises in local and social history and has written books on the history of the Garnock Valley and Doon Valley, including the towns of Beith, Barrmill, Dalmellington, Gateside, Kilbirnie, Patna, and Waterside. He has resided in Beith, North Ayrshire since 1986. A strong emphasis in the books is on the people and the social context of their lives.

Donald was born and brought up in Dalmellington, the son of James Reid, a miner for 43 years, and Mary Hose. He retired from the Strathclyde Police Force in 1999 with the rank of Police Superintendent. In 1994 he was accorded the honour of being selected as Beith Citizen of the Year for his voluntary work.

== Authorship ==
1. Reid, Donald L. (1994). Reflections of Beith and District – On the Wings of Time. Beith High Church Youth Group.
2. Reid, Donald L. & Monahan, Isobel F. (1998). Yesterday's Beith. A Pictorial Guide. Beith : Duke of Edinburgh Award. ISBN 0-9522720-5-9.
3. Reid, Donald L. (2000). The Beith Supplement – The Story of Beith's Newspaper. Beith : Duke of Edinburgh Award. ISBN 0-9522720-1-6.
4. Reid, Donald L. (2001). In the Valley of the Garnock. Beith, Dalry & Kilbirnie. Beith : Duke of Edinburgh Award. ISBN 0-9522720-5-9.
5. Reid, Donald L. (2001). Old Beith. Ochiltree : Stenlake Publishing. ISBN 1-84033-126-7.
6. Reid, Donald L. (2001). Old Dalmellington, Patna and Waterside. Ochiltree : Stenlake Publishing.
7. Reid, Donald L. (2002). Doon Valley Memories. A Pictorial Reflection.
8. Reid, Donald L. (2003). Barrmill Jolly Beggars Burns Club – Reflections on a Diamond Jubilee.
9. Reid, Donald L. (2004). Doon Valley Bygones.
10. Reid, Donald L. (2005). Yesterday's Patna & The Lost Villages of the Doon valley.
11. Reid, Donald L. (2005). Robert Burns' Valley of Doon – An Ayrshire Journey Down Memory Lane.
12. Reid, Donald L. (2006). More Old Beith.
13. Reid, Donald L. (2009). Discovering Matthew Anderson. Policeman-Poet of Ayrshire. Beith : Cleland Crosbie. ISBN 0-9522720-9-1.
14. Reid, Donald L. (2010). Beith, Barrmill & Gateside. Precious memories. ISBN 978-0-9566343-1-3.
15. Reid, Donald L. (2012). The Lost Mining Villages of Doon Valley. Voices and Images of Ayrshire. ISBN 978-0-9566343-3-7.
16. Reid, Donald L. (2016).The Last Miners of Ayrshire's Doon Valley. ISBN 978-0-9566343-5-1.
17. Reid, Donald L. (2017). Doon Valley Tales. In the News. ISBN 978-0-9566343-8-2.
18. Reid, Donald L. (2019). More Doon Valley Tales. A Keek into our Past. ISBN 978-0-9566343-9-9.
