= Minishant =

Coordinates: 55.3940°N 4.6389°W

Minishant: Scottish Gaelic: Muine Seant; Scots: Minyshant
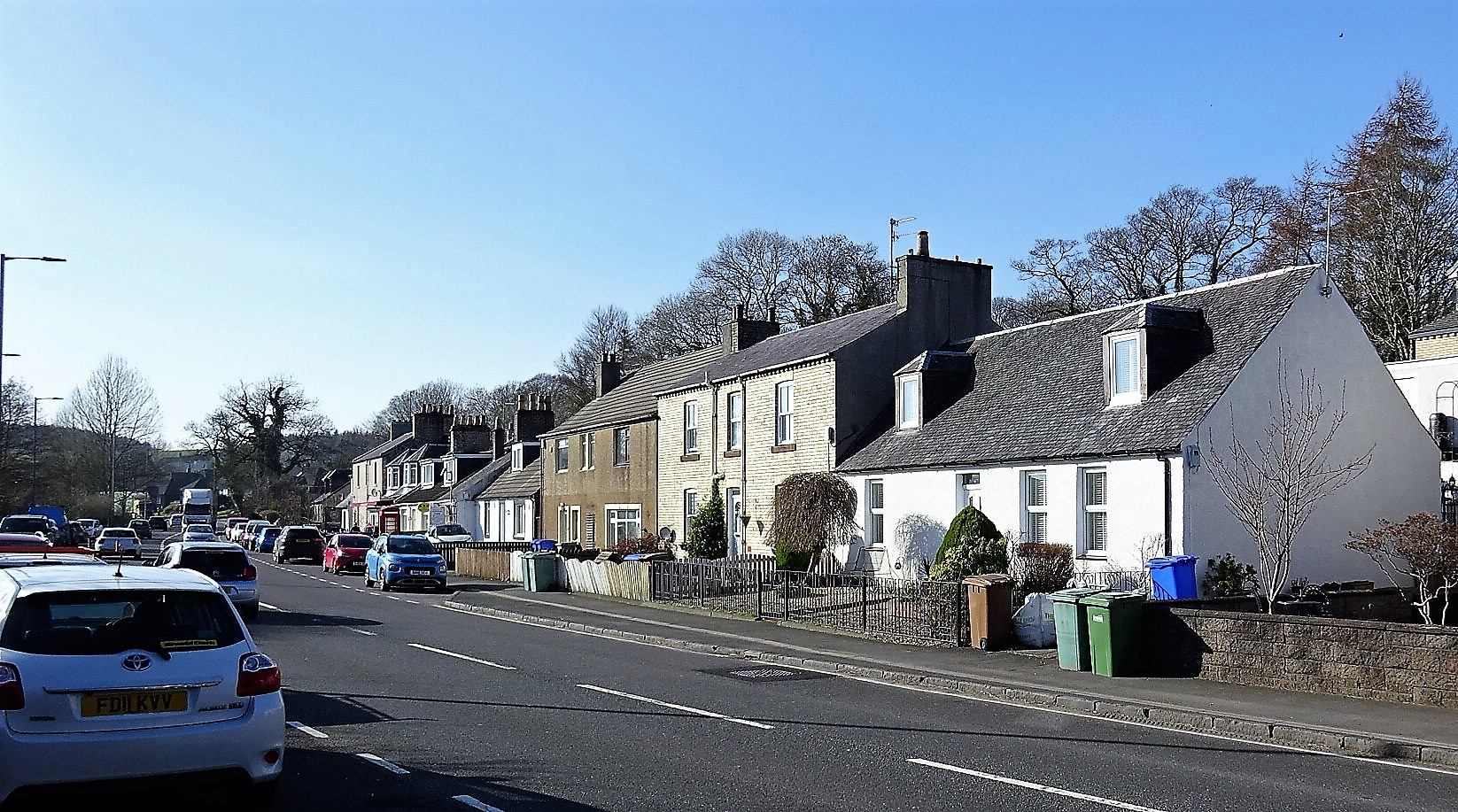
- Minishant Main Street and the A77

- Location within South Ayrshire
- Population: 200
- OS grid reference: NS329142
- Council area: South Ayrshire
- Lieutenancy area: Ayrshire and Arran
- Country: Scotland
- Sovereign state: United Kingdom
- Post town: AYR
- Dialling code: 01292
- Police: Scotland
- Fire: Scottish
- Ambulance: Scottish
- UK Parliament: Central Ayrshire
- Scottish Parliament: Carrick, Cumnock and Doon Valley; South Scotland

Minishant is a village bordering the A77 in the old county of Carrick, South Ayrshire, Scotland. It is located in Maybole Parish, 3 1/2 miles (5.5 kilometres) from Maybole and standing close to the River Doon. The village was originally named Culroy after the Culroy Burn that runs through it.

== History ==
Near Grange House is the hamlet of Culroy which was often called Culroy Bridge or Culroy Smithy until Minishant permanently adopted its 'new' name. Culroy was once the name for all the land between the Brown Carric and the River Doon.

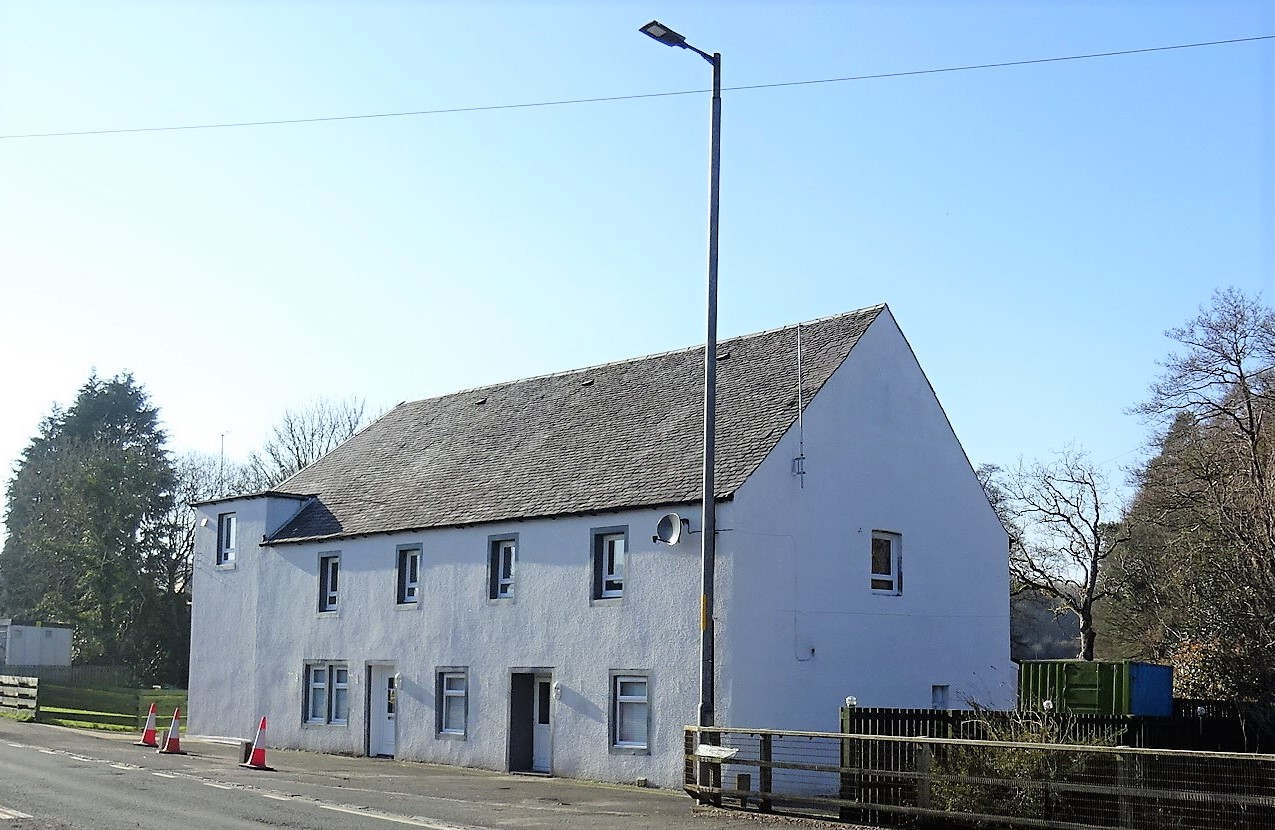
The old Minishant Waulk Mill

Minishant stands on the old Portpatrick to Ayr road, later a toll road with toll house at Carcluie and Hogg's Corner, but the village is not shown on maps until after 1828 although Colroy (sic) is marked in 1775. In 1832 Culroy Bridge is recorded and Culroy has only a single building on the eastern side of the road indicated. Minyshant (sic) appears on the OS map surveyed between 1849 and 1857 with a long row of housing and a building in the location of the mill standing next to the Culroy Burn and a building opposite. Hoggs Cottage stood at the road junction running down to Cassillis railway station.

Various council houses and a primary school were built in the 1990s and since then a small housing estate has been built off Main Street next to the Culroy Burn, partly on the site of previous houses. The village is notable for the attractive wooden fronted housing on Main Street.

=== The meaning of the place-name ===
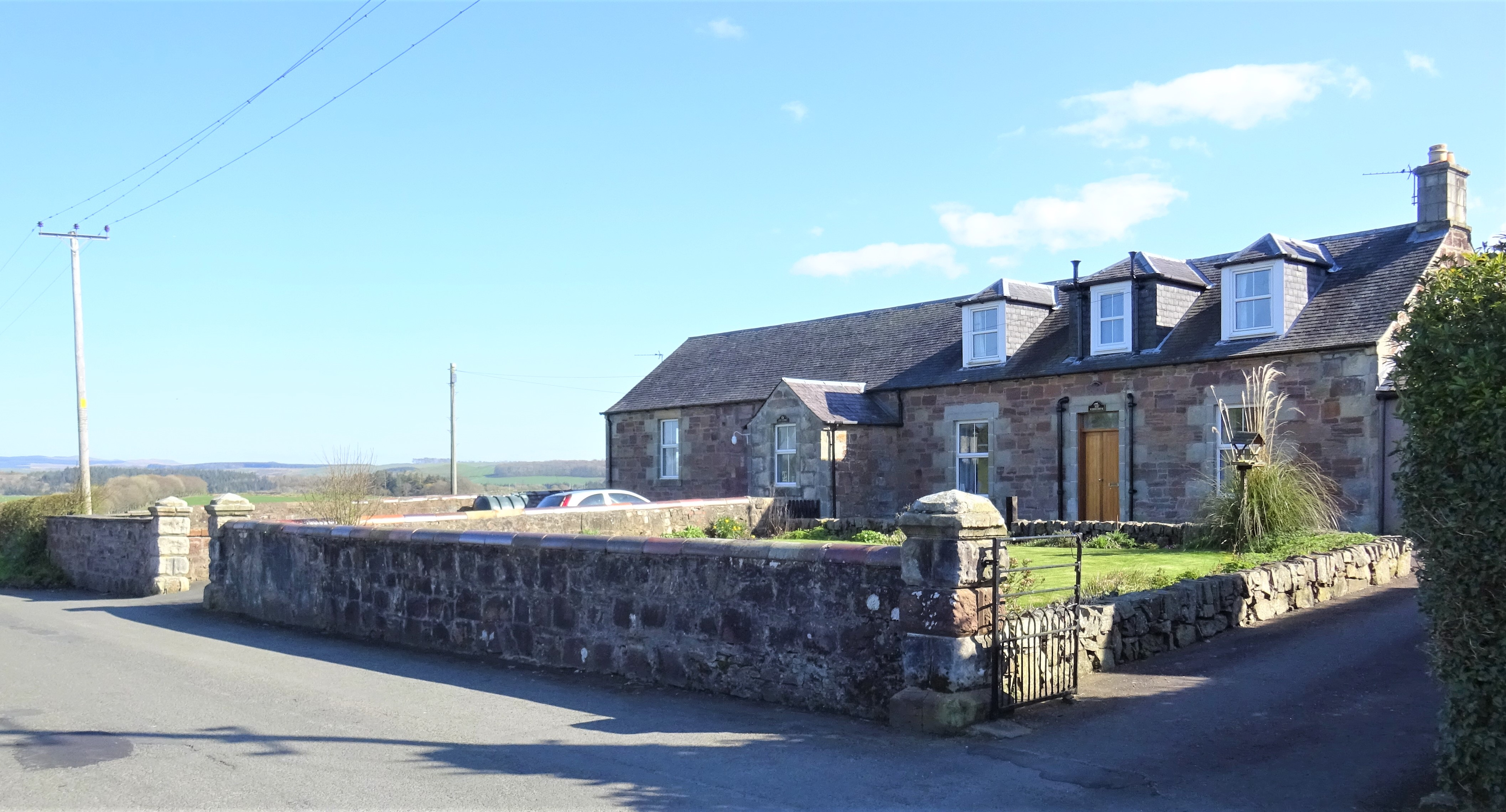
Minishant's old school on School Road.

The etymology of the name 'Minishant' can be traced back to the Scots Gaelic 'Muine Seant' or the 'Sacred thicket' equivalent to 'Holy Wood'. Monkswood is still a current placename.

=== Culroy ===
The old established settlement once known as Culroy Bridge or Smithy is a hamlet on the Culroy or Plonatibber Burn that once had a smithy and an inn with Grange House nearby. It is recorded as Colroy in 1775.

== Facilities ==
Minishant today (datum 2019) has a primary school, church, a restaurant, War Memorial, and a post office and general store. The parish comprises a mainly farming community. In the late 19th century it had a school, post office, smithy, joiner's shop, woollen factory and was served by Cassillis railway station. The old school stood about one mile (1.5 kilometres) away from the village so as to make it closer to the farms whose children also attended it, a common practice. In 1872 a new school and teacher's house was built in the village, now demolished.

== Buildings and structures ==
=== The Lady Coats Memorial Church ===
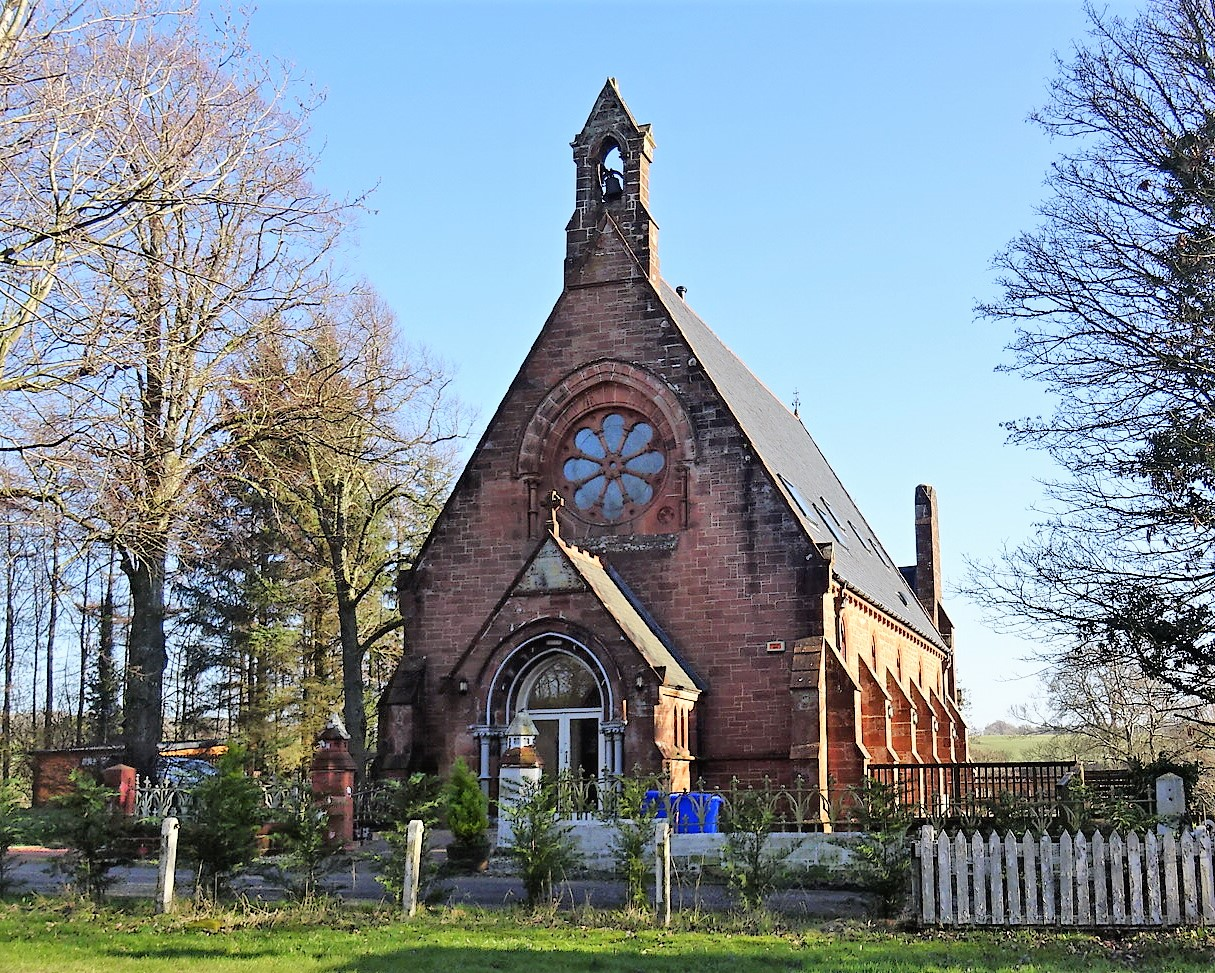
The old Lady Coats Memorial Church

The old church, known as the Lady Coats Memorial Church closed in the mid-1980s. It was built in 1878 to commemorate Lady Gloranna Coats nee McKenzie, wife of Sir Peter Coats, the laird of Auchendrane. Sir Peter was a Baptist and most of the villages were Presbyterians so the church was designated non-denominational or non-sectarian and open to appropriate visiting ministers. An exact copy of the church was built by Sir Peter Coats in Algiers where he moved to improve his health. Behind the church was a reading room and library, open to all in the district.

=== Minishant War Memorial ===
The war memorial Celtic cross was dedicated in 1920 and was unveiled by the factor of the nearby Monkwood Estate, Major James Murdoch. It was originally located in the forecourt of the Lady Coats Memorial Church but it was moved to Main Street in 1987 when the church closed and public access was restricted.

=== The Waulk Mill ===
Standing next to the Minishant Bridge over the Culroy or Polnatibber Burn the waulk or wauk's waterwheel was powered via a mill weir, lade and sluice arrangement. Andrew and James Limond at the mill advertised that they manufactured blankets, tweeds, plaidings, flannels, etc. It is shown on the OS map as being disused by 1894. The mill building survives, having become the village hall and later a private dwelling.

In 1894 a second steam-powered woollen mill, also owned by the Limond brothers, stood behind the row of cottages near the waulk mill sluice. A short tramway incline with a waggon on a rope, known as the Bogey Line, transported coal up to the mill. The Bogey End on the Mains Street was where the coal was loaded into the waggon. The mill closed in 1950.

=== The Minishant Inn ===
An old inn that is now in use as a restaurant.

=== Cassillis railway station ===
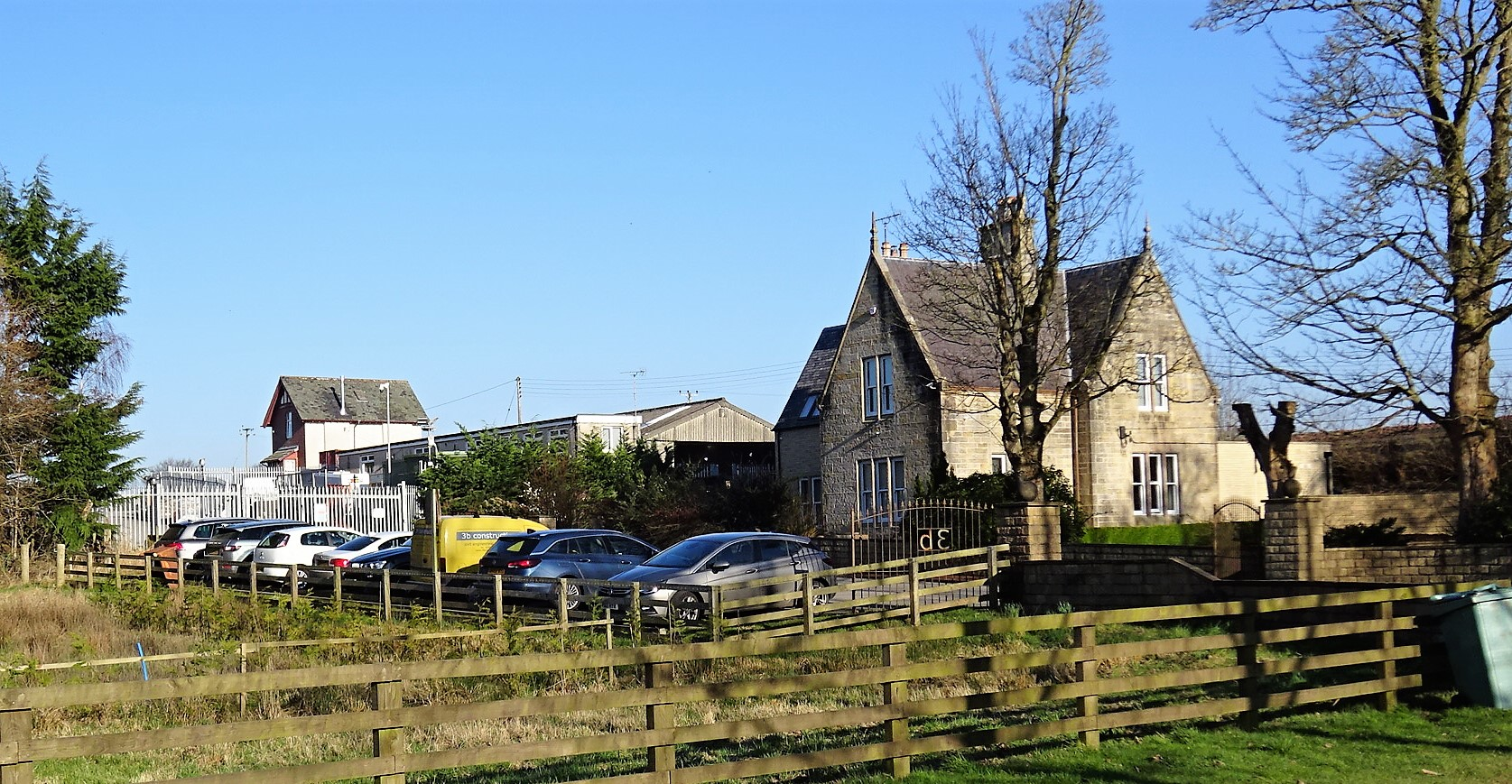
Cassillis Villa and old railway station site

Cassillis railway station was opened on 13 October 1856 by the Ayr and Maybole Junction Railway the line passed to the Glasgow and South Western Railway. The station served Minishant and the nearby farming area including Cassillis House and estate. Originally it was a single platform station however a second platform was added with a goods yard when the line was doubled. Cassillis closed 6 December 1954 however the now single track line to Maybole, Girvan and Stranraer remains in regular use. The regular bus service on the A77 drew passengers away from this 'out of the way' station.

=== Cassillis Villa ===
A building known as Cassillis Villa is associated with the station from around 1894, however, a stationmaster's house stood near the platforms and the villa may have been linked to the Cassillis House requirements in some fashion.

== Country houses ==
=== Grange House ===
Once part of the lands of Little Maybole or Maybothelbeg granted by Duncan, 1st Earl of Carrick, to the monks of Melrose Abbey. A large granary is thought to have been present here and part of its walls are thought to survive within the stable buildings. In the Book of Melrose a record survives of Robert the Bruce in 1301 confirming a grant of the 'Grange of Maybothyl' to the Cistercian monks of Melrose Abbey. A cloaca-like tunnel or drain, large enough for a person to walk through in a crouched position, runs to the north-east from that side of the house and is thought to have been associated with the old monk's grange being comparable to those found at Paisley Abbey, Fountains Abbey, Dundrennan Abbey and significantly Melrose Abbey.

After the Scottish Reformation the Kennedy family acquired the property and it eventually was sold to Gilbert McMikin in 1752. The 18th-century Georgian mansion house was built either by Gilbert of by his son John who had married into the Craufurd family of Ardmillan.

=== Otterden House ===
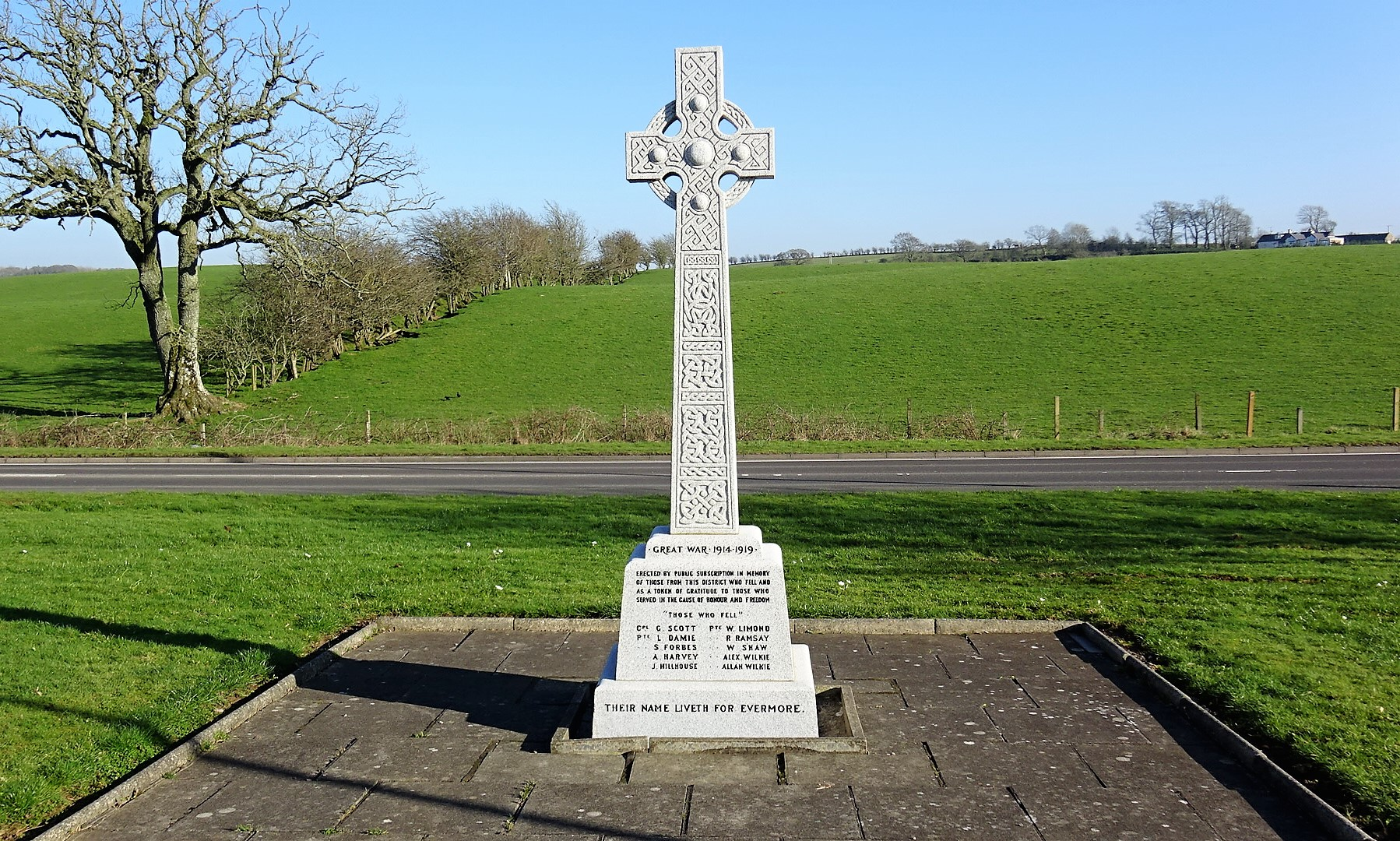
The Minishant War Memorial

The Rankines or McRankine family anciently lived at Otterden and a James McRankine is recorded as holding the lands in 1657. In 1864 Dr Rankine of Otterden lived at the property with his wife and family.

Otterden is a small 1780 laird's mansion house with evidence of an earlier building. It was formerly known as West Knockdon, built in the Scottish Georgian style. Alterations were made in the early 19th century and later two rear wings were added.

=== Sauchrie House ===
In 1618 a James Chalmers was resident at Sauchrie. In 1729 the lands were held by the Wallace family, followed in 1834 by Archibald Kelso and then Alexander Mitchell, an advocate.

Sauchrie is a dwelling with features from the 17th and 18th centuries as well as the 19th. John McAdam returned from America in 1783 and had work carried out as did Archibald Kelso in 1817–18. John Loudon McAdam the road builder lived here for a time.

=== Carwinshoch House ===
Originally a mid-19th century gamekeeper's cottage this building has been extended and contains a number of fittings from the demolished Fullarton House, including Corinthian carved pilasters.

=== Auchendrane House ===
Once the site of Auchendrane Castle this was held by Robert Brown but the barony was granted to a supporter, Henry Annan, by King Robert the Bruce. The Mures or Muirs, descended from the Mures of Rowallan, then held the Barony of Auchendrane and the details of their fatal feud with the Kennedy family is recorded in Sir Walter Scott's poem the Auchindrane or the Ayrshire Tragedy.

The property passed into the ownership of the Fergusons of Kilkerran and was then purchased by Elias Cathcart. James Ferguson purchased the property in 1839 and intended to build a mansion house however in 1856 J. Fairful Smith acquired Auchendrane, built a mansion house, gardens and laid out the grounds with paths, etc. In 1868 Sir Peter Coats, the thread manufacturer and philanthropist, purchased the estate and in 1881 built an extension and remodelled the 1856 mansion house that stands on the banks of the River Doon. It has architectural elements drawn from the nearby Crossraguel Abbey and Kelburn Castle. He was the co-founder of J & P Coats and had twelve children by his wife Gloranna McKenzie. The eldest son, James Coats (1834–1913) became a baronet.

In 1883 a rustic cottage in the grounds housed statues of the principal characters in Robert Burns's classic poem 'Tam o'Shanter'.

=== Monkwood House and Grove ===
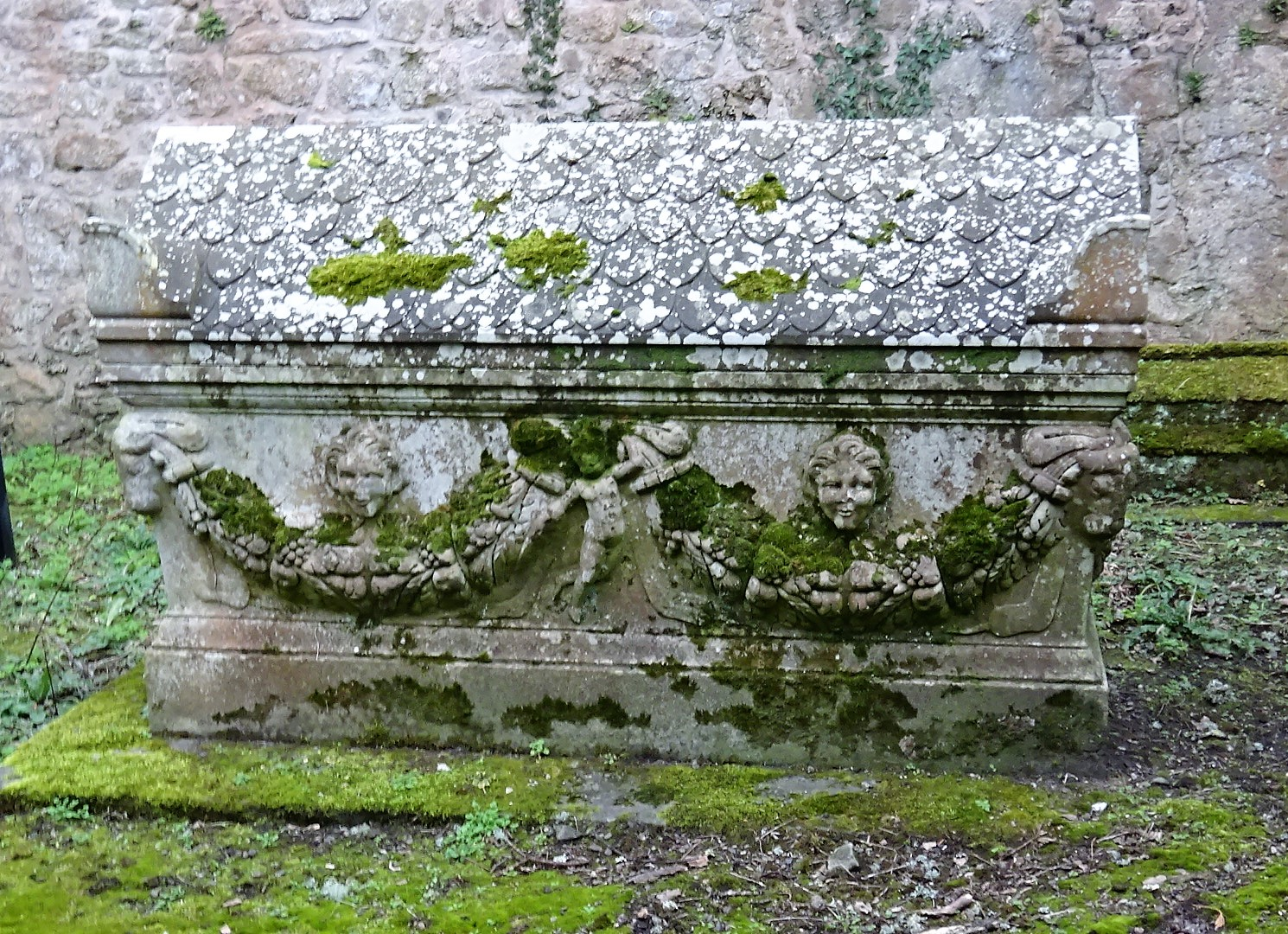
Sarcophagus of David Cathcart of Middle Auchendrane or Blairstoun, Lord Alloway in Alloway Auld Kirk

A chapel is said to have existed in the vicinity prior to the Scottish Reformation. After the Reformation Hugh Kennedy of Ardmillan obtained the lands and thereafter they passed to John Mure. Robert Muir married Barbara Barclay of Perceton and subsequently the property passed to the Hutchison family. James Ferguson of Bank married a Hutchison heiress and later the property was sold to William Paterson.

Standing beside the River Doon this 1720s Georgian mansion was once home to the author James Paterson (1805 - 1876) who wrote the definitive five volume History of the County of Ayr and Wigton. Monkwood was briefly known as Paterson House and has an old walled garden and an artificial lochan. It may have been built for George Hutchison of Monkwood or his son.

Monkwood Grove was once home to 'the father of Scottish botany', James Smith (1759–1848). James is buried in Ayr's Old Kirkyard and this claim to botanical fame is recorded on his gravestone. He created the Monkwood Botanic Garden and Nursery at his home and built up a collection of around 2000 rare and exotic plants. The garden and cottage no longer exist; due to its remote location it was known locally as 'Fin' Me Oot' Cottage.

=== Nether Auchendrane or Blairstoun ===
Nether Auchendrane was held by William Broune and then by the Schaws of Sauchy. A much-enlarged mansion incorporating the 16th-century tower house of the Blairs, later held by the Cathcarts. The Blairs changed the name Middle Auchendrane to Blairstoun. In 1698 James Blair sold the estate to Robert Muir, Provost of Ayr. Mary Mure was the heiress of Blairstoun and upon marrying David Cathcart, Lord Alloway, it passed to her eldest son, Elais Cathcart, in 1819.

== Archaeology ==
St Helen's Well, now capped, once stood near Low Milton Farm. Mote Knowe or Monkwood Mains Dun (NS337139) is a circular stone walled fortification with facing stones near Stewart's Craig on the River Doon near Monkwood Mains standing on an isolated knoll on the west side of the River Doon. A flat stone was laid on top of Newark Hill to commemorate the destruction of the Spanish Armada, people having gathered there at the time to observe the Spanish ships.

=== Wallace's Stone ===
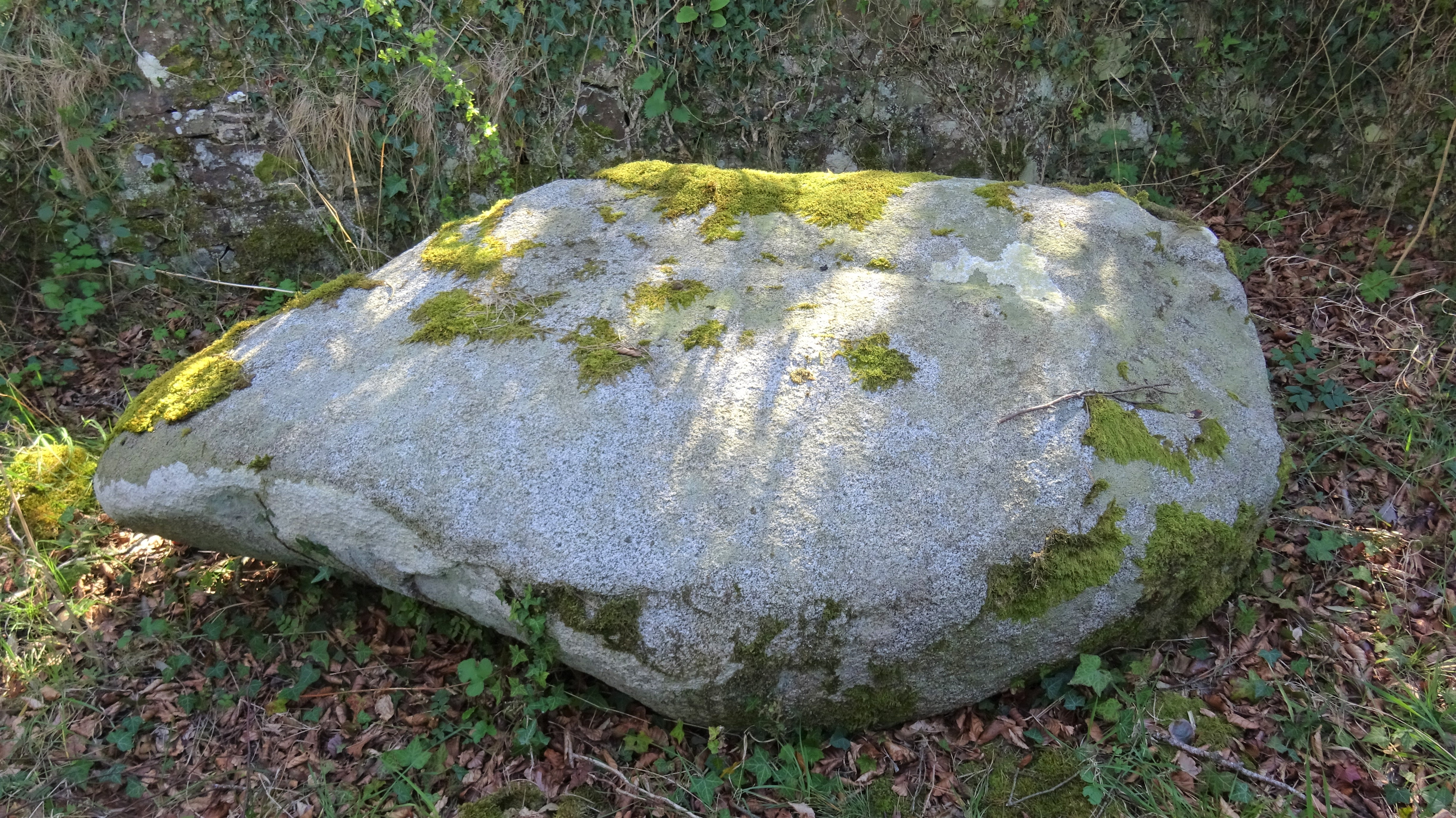
Wallace's Stone.

Located near Nether Auchendrane at Blairston Mains Farm (NS332165) Wallace's Stone has a cross engraved upon a now recumbent suspected megalithic standing stone, probably carried out to Christianise this pagan structure. The cross is sword-like with expanded terminals and a shaft that tapers towards a sword-like tip. William Wallace, the Scottish hero, has also been associated with this stone, the tradition locally being that he laid his sword on the granite boulder and someone carved out its image on the stone or in another version it miraculously formed its own impression in the whinstone. It has also been linked to King Robert the Bruce and another tradition is that it was created by a respected holy man to seal a peace treaty ending a feud between a King of the Picts and a King of the Scots, and after laying his cross upon the whinstone boulder it left an imprint.

The 3.5 foot long stone was originally near Wallace's Cave in the Long Glen however it was decided that it should be more visible so it was dragged by a team of Clydesdales to its present location. It was too difficult to stabilise in a standing position so it remains horizontal on the ground. It may have been one of a series of stones marking the ancient pilgrims' route to Whithorn.

=== Wallace's Cave ===
In the Long Glen (NS326161) close to Whiteleys Farm is a cave with an entrance level with the watercourse and local legend has it that William Wallace hid at this location after the "Barns of Ayr" incident in 1297. It is on the south bank of the Long Glen Burn and has an entrance that is about 5 feet in height and about two at the bottom. The tool marks on the twelve-foot tunnel are suggestive of it being largely man-made. The roof slopes downwards towards the back of the cave. Unusually no association with the Covenanters seems to be locally recorded.
