= Donald Reed =

Donald or Don Reed may refer to:

- Donald Reed (actor) (1901–1973), Mexican-American film actor, and later, Beverly Hills video consultant
- Don Reed (American football) (1920–2012), head coach for the Long Beach State 49ers football program
- Don Reed (politician) (1933–1996), American politician, member of the Florida House of Representatives
- Donald A. Reed (1935–2001), founder of the Academy of Science Fiction, Fantasy and Horror Films and its Saturn Awards
- Don Collins Reed, American ethicist and historian of philosophy
- Don Reed (comedian) (born 1959), American actor, writer, producer, director and comedian

== See also ==
- Donald Reid (disambiguation)
