= J. Don Read =

Canadian psychologist (born 1943)

John Donald Read
- Born: 1943 (age 81–82)
- Citizenship: Canada
- Scientific career
- Fields: Cognitive Psychology
- Institutions: Simon Fraser University

John Donald Read (born 1943) is a Canadian psychologist and is currently employed as professor of psychology and chair of the psychology department at Simon Fraser University in Canada. He works primarily in the field of Law and Forensics and has conducted research in the fields of human memory, eyewitness memory and the legal system.

== Education ==
Don Read received a bachelor's degree with honours in Psychology from University of British Columbia in 1964. He then completed his Master of Science in Experimental Psychology at Kansas State University in 1966 writing his thesis on extraserial cues in verbal learning. In 1966 he received a Ph.D. in Experimental Psychology from Kansas State University. The topic for his Ph.D. dissertation was positive and negative information in human learning.

== Career ==
From 1969 to 1999 Read was employed at University of Lethbridge, starting as assistant professor and working his way up to full professor. From 2000-2008 he worked as adjunct professor at University of Victoria, and again from 2010-2013. From 2002–present he has been employed at Simon Fraser University. He started as full professor and director for the Law and Psychology Program and from 2009 he has been employed as full professor and chair. During his career he has also been Visiting Scholar and Visiting Professor at University of Colorado (1976) and University of Victoria (1991-1992, 1997-1999). Read is on the Governing Board of the Society of Applied Research in Memory and Cognition (SARMAC). From 2000-2005 he was the editor representing SARMAC for the journal "Applied Cognitive Psychology". He is now on the editorial board for "Applied Cognitive Psychology".

Read's teaching interests are psychology and the law and applied cognitive psychology.

=== Honors and awards ===
year	Award
1994	Distinguished Teacher Award, University of Lethbridge
2006	Fellow of the Association for Psychological Science, field of Cognitive Psychology

== Research ==
In the early stages of his career as a scientist Read's research was mostly in the area of verbal learning. He also studied recognition and recollection of words and faces. From the early 1980s he started focusing his research more towards memory in legal settings such as eyewitness memory. In the 1990s the debate about the reality of repressed memories was a point of interest for many cognitive psychologists, Read included. In 1994 he published a paper together with Stephen Lindsay called "Psychotherapy and memories of childhood sexual abuse: A cognitive perspective". This paper was published in the journal Applied Cognitive Psychology and has been cited over 240 times by other researchers and reviewers. The paper also created a lot of discussions at the time it was published. Since then Read has conducted more research in the area of false/recovered memories. More recently Read has published more articles in the forensic field, mostly about the reliability of eyewitness testimonies and identifications.

=== Publications ===
==== Journal articles ====
(Selected publications from Simon Fraser University website. )

Read, J. D. (2006). Features of eyewitness testimony evidence implicated in wrongful convictions. Manitoba Law Journal, 31, 523-542.

Connolly, D. A. & Read, J. D. (2006). Delayed prosecutions of historic child sexual abuse: Analyses of 2064 Canadian criminal complaints. Law and Human Behavior, 30, 409-434.

Read, J. D., Connolly, D. A., & Welsh, A. (2006) Prediction of verdicts in archival cases of historical child sexual abuse. Law and Human Behavior, 30, 259-285.

Lindsay, D. S., Hagen, L., Read, J. D., Wade, K. A., & Garry, M. (2004) True photographs and false memories. Psychological Science. 15, 149-154.

Wade, K. A., Garry, M., Read, J. D., & Lindsay, D. S. (2002). A picture is worth a thousand lies: Using false photographs to create false childhood memories. Psychonomic Bulletin & Review, 9, 597-603.

Read, J. D., & Lindsay, D. S. (2000). The amnestic consequences of summer camps and high school graduations: Effects of memory retrieval upon reported amnesia. Journal of Traumatic Stress, 13, 129-147.

Lindsay, D. S., Read, J. D., & Sharma, K. (1998). Accuracy and confidence in person identification: The relationship is strong when witnessing conditions vary widely (as they do across real-world witnesses). Psychological Science, 9, 215-218.

Read, J. D. (1996). From a passing thought to a false memory in 2 minutes: Confusing real and illusory events. Psychonomic Bulletin & Review, 3, 105-111.

Lindsay, D. S, & Read, J. D. (1994). Psychotherapy and memories of childhood sexual abuse: A cognitive perspective. Applied Cognitive Psychology, 8, 281-338.

Read, J. D., Yuille, J. C., & Tollestrup, P. (1992). Recollections of a robbery: Effects of alcohol and arousal upon recall and person identification. Law and Human Behavior, 16, 425-446.

==== Books ====
Toglia, M. P., Read, J. D., Ross, D. F., & Lindsay, R. C. L. (Eds.), (2007) Handbook of eyewitness psychology: Volume I: Memory for events. Mahwah, NJ: Erlbaum Associates. 744 pp.

Lindsay, R. C. L., Ross, D. F., Read, J. D., & Toglia, M. P. (Eds.), (2007) Handbook of eyewitness psychology: Volume II: Memory for people. Mahwah, NJ: Erlbaum Associates. 648 pp.

Read, J. D. & Lindsay, D. S. (1997). Recollections of trauma: Scientific research and clinical practice. Plenum Publishing.

Ross, D. F., Read, J. D., & Toglia, M. P. (1994). Adult eyewitness testimony: Current trends and developments. New York: Cambridge University Press. 418 pp.

Thompson, C. P., Herrmann, Bruce, D., Read, J. D., Payne, D., & Toglia, M. P. (1998). Autobiographical memory: Theoretical and applied perspectives. Erlbaum.

Thompson, C. P., Herrmann, D., Read, J. D., Bruce, D., Payne, D., & Toglia, M. P. (1998). Eyewitness memory: Theoretical and applied perspectives. Erlbaum.
