= Dalmellington =

Coordinates: 55.324°N 4.397°W

Dalmellington: Scottish Gaelic: Dail M'Fhaolain; Scots: Dawmellinton
- Market town and civil parish
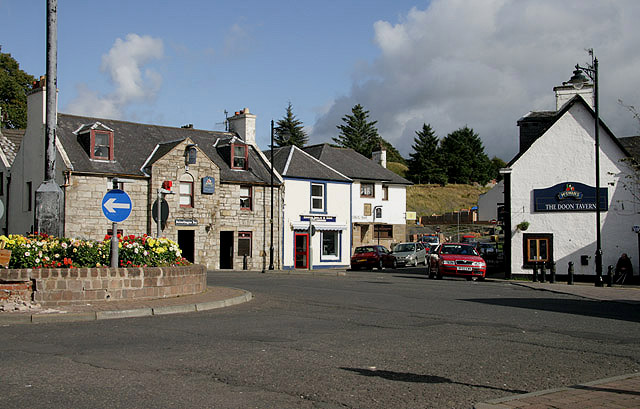
- Dalmellington Town Centre

- Location within East Ayrshire
- Population: 1,340 (2020)
- OS grid reference: NS4764805958
  - Edinburgh: 64 mi (103 km)
  - London: 317 mi (510 km)
- Council area: East Ayrshire
- Lieutenancy area: East Ayrshire
- Country: Scotland
- Sovereign state: United Kingdom
- Post town: AYR
- Postcode district: KA6
- Dialling code: 01292
- Police: Scotland
- Fire: Scottish
- Ambulance: Scottish
- UK Parliament: Ayr, Carrick and Cumnock
- Scottish Parliament: Carrick, Cumnock and Doon Valley

Dalmellington (Scots: Dawmellinton, Scottish Gaelic: Dail M'Fhaolain) is a market town and civil parish in East Ayrshire, Scotland.

In 2001, the town had a population of 1,407. The town owes its origins to the fault line separating the Southern Uplands of Scotland from the Central Lowlands. Dalmellington sits at the issue of a river from the uplands into Dalmellington Moss plain.

The town has a history as a rest area, market town, weaving centre and mining village. The Chalmerston open cast coal mine to the north of the village covered some 742 hectares, but the operations have now ceased and the first phase of the site restoration has been completed. The town used to have a working museum to record the history of the area, but it was closed in January 2017.

== History ==
Dalmellington is an ancient settlement of indeterminate origin. It is probable that the area was first occupied some 6,000 years ago, when humans moved inland from the West Coast along the rivers. It was certainly occupied by the Neolithic Period, as cairns and a few scraps of tools from this period have been found. In recent years traces of early human activity have been found around Loch Doon. There may have been crannogs at Bogton Loch and Loch Doon. In the medieval period Dalmellington was part of Kyle Stewart and under the rule of a series of Norman lords, invited to Scotland by the king to assist in subduing the country. On behalf of the king they collected taxes and administered justice. It was during this period that "The Dalmellington Motte" was constructed.

Events from the past have underlined Dalmellington's geographical importance, it is believed that the Doon Valley was a Roman thoroughfare and even possibly a Roman military station. During the time of the Covenanters, 900 soldiers were stationed in the vicinity. There were two castles in the area, Loch Doon and Laight Alpin. Eighteenth-century Dalmellington was a small rural village with some 500 inhabitants, but the modern way of life was already taking shape. Good quality coal was being produced from surface workings and sent down the turnpike road to Galloway. The town grew after James Watt's steam engine had made deeper mine workings feasible, and the completion of the railway in 1858.

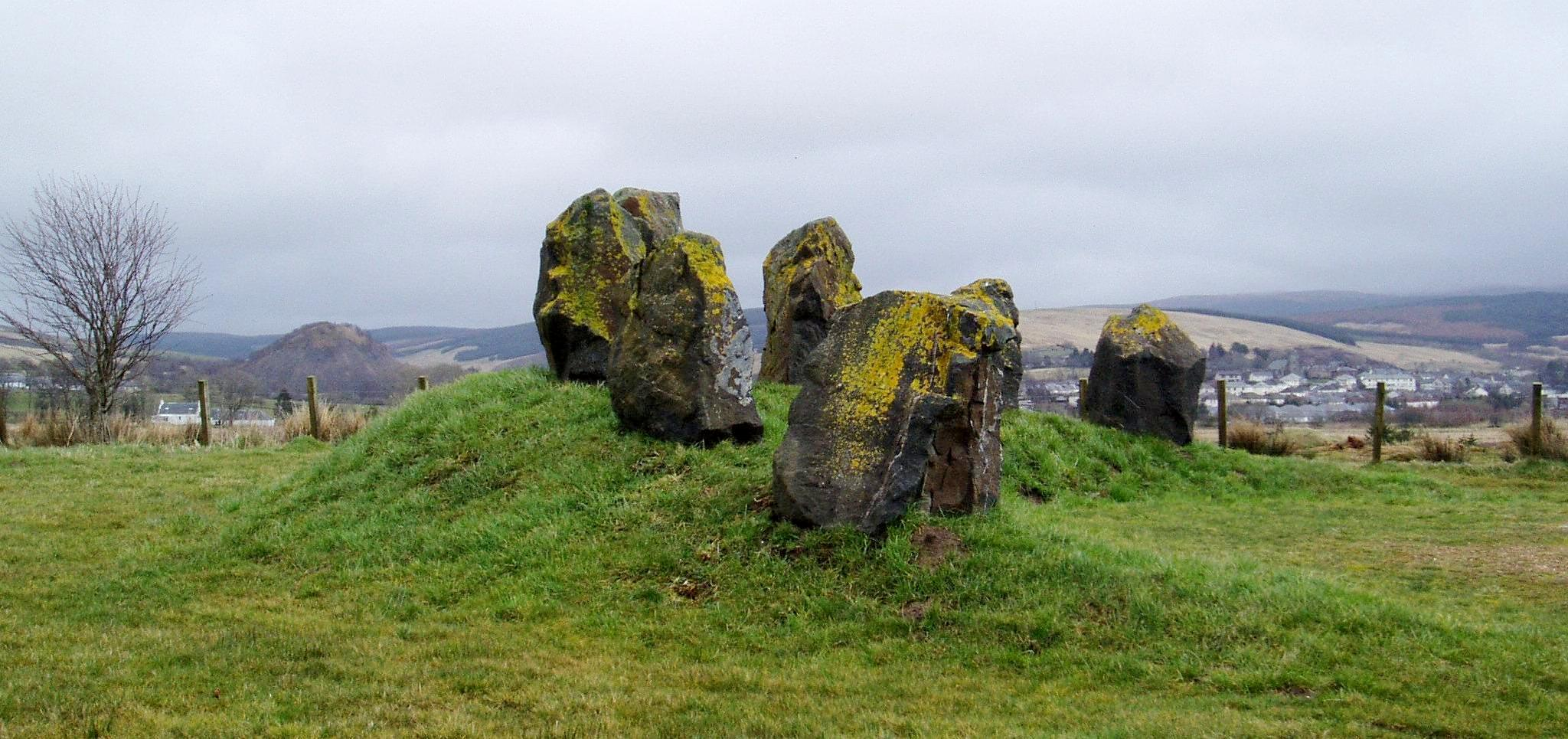
The Standing Stones of Dalmellington. A memorial erected in 1999 to the seven mining villages of the Doon Valley

Apart from the coal mining, there were 8,000 sheep and 800 black cattle on the hills, and plans were afoot for the spinning and weaving of wool. These plans resulted in two woollen mills which flourished for a time in the following century. The two mills employed about 30 people between them. The yarn from the largest was disposed of wholly to the Kilmarnock carpet manufacturers until the proprietor of the mill added a carpet manufactory with eight looms constantly at work. The yarn spun in the second mill was also manufactured on the spot, into blankets, into plaid, packing cloth, etc. There were also about 40 weavers working from home. Although by the 20th Century mining was the dominant industry, workers had to travel to outlying areas. Eight pits producing around 124,000 tons a year were operating in the 1940s. With the decline of the labour-intensive deep mining, the area was dependent on its replacement, opencast mining.

During the First World War an ultimately unsuccessful attempt was made to establish a gunnery school at Loch Doon. Although it was in breach of the Geneva Convention, large numbers of German prisoners were involved in its construction. The Loch Doon Aerial Gunnery School Railway ran from near Dalmellington station to Dalfarson, close to Craigengillan House.

From 1997 to 2005, Dalmellington was a book town, owing to the high number of bookshops in the town, although the last one closed in 2005.

== Economy and interest ==
There are many Sites of Special Scientific Interest around Dalmellington, the most notable being the nearby Loch Doon. Selection of local views The Scottish Dark Sky Observatory was located near Dalmellington and is within the northern edge of the Galloway Forest Dark Sky Park, however it was completely destroyed by fire in the early hours of 23 June 2021.

== Education and culture ==
The village has two schools within the "Doon Campus": Dalmellington Primary School and Doon Academy.

Dalmellington Craigengillan Curling Club is the oldest constituted club in Dalmellington; it was formed on 3 December 1841 in the Black Bull Hotel and has continued unbroken since. In 2004 the members reinstated the outside curling pond at Craigengillan, this is the only self leveling curling pond in Scotland.

=== Dalmellington Band ===
Dalmellington Band is based in the village of Dalmellington and it is one of Scotland's oldest Brass Bands and has been in the forefront of the movement since its formation in 1864. The band have had notable success in contests and have their name inscribed on every major competition trophy in Scotland, including three Scottish Championship wins. The band regularly provide music for: concerts, gala days, weddings, church services, opening days, parades, background music and Christmas events. In 2014, the band celebrated its 150th year.

=== Dalmellington bug ===
The Dalmellington bug was an error in the Post Office Horizon IT system named after the Post Office branch in Dalmellington where it was discovered in 2015. Horizon was duplicating the acceptance of remittances despite the payment’s barcode having only been scanned in once. This would lead Horizon to be short because the subpostmaster repeatedly attempted to send the transfer, believing it to have failed when screen freezes forced them to log off.

The Post Office held subpostmasters responsible for any shortfalls that couldn’t be explained and prosecuted them for theft and false accounting. It denied that there were bugs that could cause unexplained shortages. Dalmellington was proof a bug did exist and was used as evidence in the 2018/19 High Court case, where Sir Alan Bates and 550 other subpostmasters proved that computer errors could be to blame for accounting shortfalls.

== Notable people ==
- Robert Hetrick, the blacksmith-poet, lived in the town in the 19th century.
- Playwright Ena Lamont Stewart died in the village.
- Donald Lees Reid, author.
