= Ayr and Dalmellington Railway =

Former railway line in Scotland

The Ayr and Dalmellington Railway was a railway company in Scotland, which connected the growing ironworks community around Dalmellington with Ayr, in Ayrshire, Scotland. Its route was originally planned by the Ayrshire and Galloway Railway as part of a scheme to link Ayr with Castle Douglas, but lack of funds limited the construction to a very short section connecting the iron and coal pits of the Dalmellington Iron Company with its iron works, opening in 1849.

The remainder of the line opened in 1856. It was the first railway to cross the river at Ayr. At that time the main line from Glasgow terminated at a station north of the river. After opening of the line, the railway was extended eventually to Stranraer, diverging from the Dalmellington line at Dalrymple Junction, and in time this became the dominant section.

The branch line was heavily dependent on traffic from the Iron Company, and when that closed down, the branch line lost its passenger service, and now only carries mineral trains from open-cast workings.

The northern section of the line remains open as part of the Glasgow–Ayr–Stranraer route (2014).

== History ==
=== A false start ===
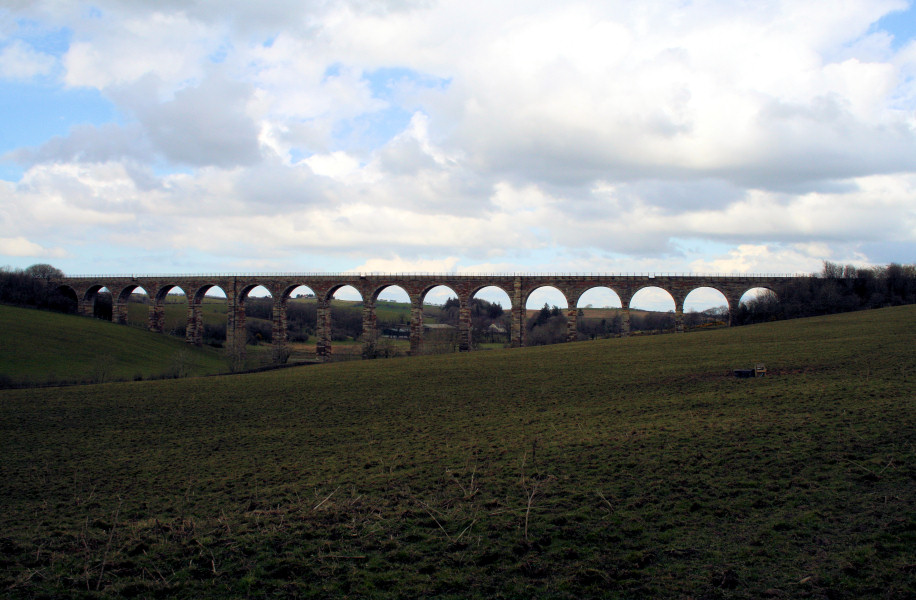
The Burnton Viaduct near Dalrymple in 2008

The Glasgow, Paisley, Kilmarnock and Ayr Railway (GPK&AR) had reached Ayr in 1840, but its Ayr station was on the north bank of the River Ayr. (The GPK&AR was a predecessor company of the Glasgow and South Western Railway.) Although consideration was soon afterwards given to building a line southwards into Galloway, the daunting topography of any such route delayed any action on the matter.

In 1845 there was huge interest in railway investments, and a number of ambitious schemes were proposed, including a railway from Ayr to the shores of Loch Ryan, by way of Ballantrae, and sponsored by the GPKA&R, and titled the Glasgow and Belfast Union Railway. There was also an independent British and Irish Union Railway from Dumfries via Castle Douglas to Portpatrick. Both proposals sought a connection with the ferry service from Portpatrick to Donaghadee in the north of Ireland.

Glasgow, Paisley, Kilmarnock and Ayr Railway and Glasgow and Belfast Union Railway Amendment and Branches (No. 1) Act 1847
- Act of Parliament
- Parliament of the United Kingdom
- Long title: An Act to enable the Glasgow, Paisley, Kilmarnock, and Ayr Railway Company to make certain Branch Railways in the County of Ayr, and to alter the Line of the Glasgow and Belfast Union Railway; and for other Purposes.
- Citation: 10 & 11 Vict. c. clxxxiv

Dates
- Royal assent: 9 July 1847

Other legislation
- Repealed by: Glasgow and South Western Railway Consolidation Act 1855

Status: Repealed

Text of statute as originally enacted

An Ayrshire and Galloway Railway (A&GR) proposed to build from a junction with the Glasgow and Belfast Union at Smithston, near Patna, by way of Dalmellington to Castle Douglas, there linking with the British and Irish Union Railway. The capital was to be £650,000; the company was courting the Caledonian Railway who had plans to reach Ayr across country. However, the frenzied promotion of railway schemes, not all of them practicable, came to an end and in 1846. the British and Irish Union announced on 21 April 1846 that it was discontinuing its attempts to raise money for its line. The A&GR itself found raising money difficult, and this loss of connectivity at Castle Douglas (for Dumfries) was a blow. Consideration was given to abandoning their own scheme too, but the promoters decided to proceed, and a bill was submitted to Parliament. The preamble to the bill was found to be "not proved" (Note: That is, the claimed benefits to the public did not justify the interference with existing rights, or that the practicability of the scheme was in doubt; or that the required 10% of projected capital had not been deposited. Beyond Dalmellington the line would have run through very sparsely populated country, with only Castle Douglas itself at its termination.) and the scheme was reduced by Parliament, to run between Smithston (near Patna) and Dalmellington only, a small fraction of its intended course. The Glasgow, Paisley, Kilmarnock and Ayr Railway and Glasgow and Belfast Union Railway Amendment and Branches (No. 1) Act 1847 (10 & 11 Vict. c. clxxxiv) gave the company running powers over the Glasgow and Belfast Union line (under consideration at the same time) between Ayr and Smithston.

Glasgow and Belfast Union Railway Act 1846
- Act of Parliament
- Parliament of the United Kingdom
- Long title: An Act for making a Railway from the Glasgow, Paisley, Kilmarnock, and Ayr Railway near the Manse of Newton to the Town of Girvan, with a Branch to the Town of Maybole, to be called "The Glasgow and Belfast Union Railway."
- Citation: 9 & 10 Vict. c. cccxcii

Dates
- Royal assent: 26 August 1846

Text of statute as originally enacted

The Glasgow and Belfast Union Railway too was in financial difficulties, although partly funded by the profitable GPK&AR, and after consideration, it pressed forward with its bill, now cutting back the scheme to reach Girvan only. It received its authorising act of Parliament, the Glasgow and Belfast Union Railway Act 1846 (9 & 10 Vict. c. cccxcii), on 26 August 1846. However the reality of the shortage of money for such a difficult proposition became unavoidable, and the powers were allowed to lapse without any actual construction.

=== Dalmellington iron works ===
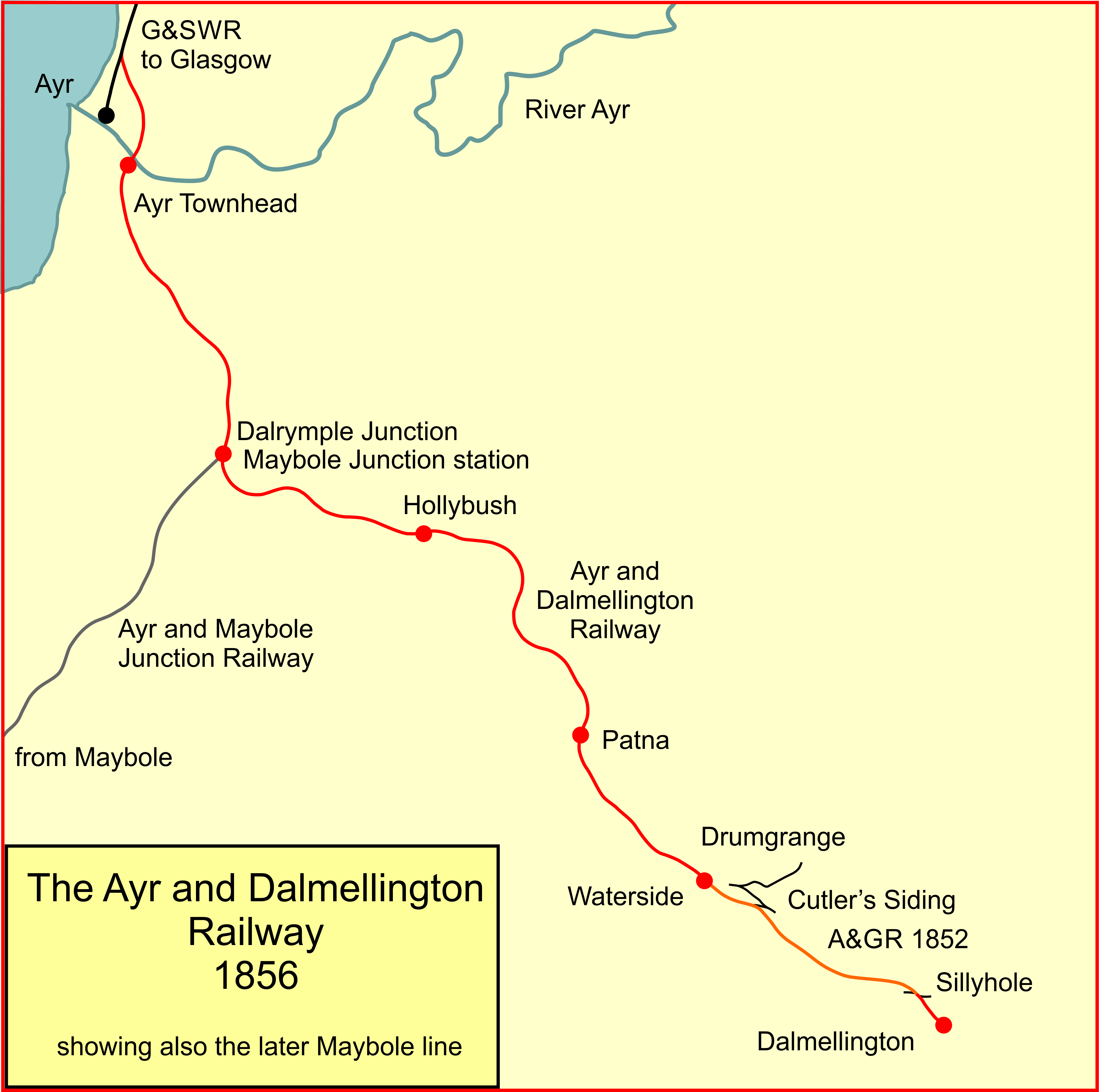
System map of the Ayr & Dalmellington Railway

The significance of Dalmellington was the substantial deposits of iron ore and of coal in the vicinity, as well as some limestone. The proximity of these minerals made the foundation of an ironworks feasible. Henry Houldsworth developed the mining and in 1846 founded an ironworks. He established tramways for local conveyance but wished to encourage the construction of the main line railway to facilitate internal transport, and more importantly transport to market.

=== A heavily reduced scheme ===
The 1846 authorisation was hardly practicable, and in the 1847 parliamentary session a further bill was presented, after consideration with Houldsworth (as the dominant potential customer) as to the way forward. With the Glasgow and Belfast Union Railway scheme abandoned, the A&GR now needed to build from Ayr instead of Smithston. The GPKA&R undertook to purchase the shares for £100,500, and the A&GR undertook to construct the section between Drumgrange, near Waterside, and Sillyhole as a first priority, to give Houldsworth the connection between the iron workings and the works, that he required. The distance was about 2 miles (about 3 km), and the section was "to be given over to [his company] to be worked by horsepower".

The enabling act of Parliament for the Ayrshire and Galloway (Smithstown and Dalmellington) Railway, the Ayrshire and Galloway (Smithstown and Dalmellington) Railway Act 1847 (10 & 11 Vict. c. x) received royal assent on 8 June 1847. The shareholders met on 22 November 1847 but too few attended to form a quorum, and the vote on sale to the GPK&AR could not be put to the meeting. The GPK&AR was in no hurry to finalise the matter, although it had purchased a large block of shares, and the delay in completion of the line led to heavy criticism by shareholders.

On 7 November 1849 the Drumgrange to Sillyhole section was completed and "handed over" (on a toll usage basis) to the Dalmellington Iron Company, ostensibly for horse operation, although the company did use small industrial locomotives.

The severe money shortage took its toll: in 1850 it was noted that the A&GR had made no effort toward constructing the remainder of its line, and that a lack of maintenance on the open section was showing itself. The company had failed to pay several creditors, and they obtained a warrant for "arrest" of the rental payments from the Dalmellington Iron Company.

=== The Glasgow and South Western Railway is formed ===
The GPK&AR became renamed the Glasgow and South Western Railway (G&SWR) on 25 October 1850, absorbing the Glasgow, Dumfries and Carlisle Railway. At this time the Ayrshire and Galloway made a final call on subscribers to its shares. The G&SWR was now the largest shareholder, and after some prevarication paid up £16,651. It then took direct control of the A&GR, installing its own directors.

=== Extending the line ===
Ayr and Dalmellington Railway Act 1853
- Act of Parliament
- Parliament of the United Kingdom
- Long title: An Act to authorize the Extension of the Railway already partly executed between Smithstown and Dalmellington in the County of Ayr to Dalmellington, and to the Glasgow and South-western Railway near Ayr.
- Citation: 16 & 17 Vict. c. cxlviii

Dates
- Royal assent: 4 August 1853

Text of statute as originally enacted

By 30 June 1851, the A&GR line had been completed from Sillyhole to Dalmellington, a distance of only a few hundred yards. However, it was not opened at this stage, as only the mineral working north of Sillyhole was in effect. The G&SWR evidently saw no benefit in completing the line to Ayr, until negotiations with the Dalmellington Iron Company resulted in a commitment from them to guarantee a 4% return on capital (of £150,000) for ten years. One hundred and thirty miles (210 km) of new railway needed to be built. The original compulsory purchase powers had expired, so a new act of Parliament needed to be obtained; this was passed on 4 August 1853 as the Ayr and Dalmellington Railway Act 1853 (16 & 17 Vict. c. cxlviii) The line would be from Falkland Junction, immediately north of the G&SWR "Ayr" terminus, to Drumgrange. A line to Girvan was being planned now, and it would diverge from the Ayr and Dalmellington line and have running powers from Ayr, in contrast to the 1845 proposal where the A&GR line was to have diverged from the G&BUR and have running powers over that line.

The line opened to goods and mineral trains on 15 May 1856. the opening to passengers was delayed due to washouts of earthworks, but it took place on 7 August 1856.

The line was difficult to work, with gradients of 1 in 70 and 1 in 90 climbing to Dalmellington, and numerous mineral tramway connections. At Ayr it diverged (considered in the southward direction) from the G&SWR Ayr line at Falkland Junction, crossing the River Ayr. A new through station at Townhead was provided, a temporary structure until 1 July 1857. The line was worked by the G&SWR, but ordinary G&SWR trains continued to use the old terminus on the north side of the River Ayr until January 1860 when it was downgraded to goods depot status, all passenger trains using the new through station.

== Later history ==
Ayr and Dalmellington Railway Transfer Act 1858
- Act of Parliament
- Parliament of the United Kingdom
- Long title: An Act for enabling the Ayr and Dalmellington Railway Company to raise additional Capital; for vesting their Undertaking in the Glasgow and South-western Railway Company; and for other Purposes.
- Citation: 21 & 22 Vict. c. lxxiii

Dates
- Royal assent: 28 June 1858

The G&SWR was working the line and had paid most of the cost of construction; it was only a matter of time until they took over the company, and they did so on 1 August 1858, by the Ayr and Dalmellington Railway Transfer Act 1858 (21 & 22 Vict. c. lxxiii) of 28 June 1858).

The Ayr and Maybole Junction Railway had been authorised in 1854, and opened to goods traffic on 15 September 1856, and to passengers on 13 October 1856. That line too was worked by the G&SWR. It diverged from the Dalmellington line at Dalrymple Junction. The G&SWR saw it as another stage of an extension to Stranraer, and that objective was achieved in 1877. The Dalmellington line continued operating a heavy mineral service, and the long Stranraer line had a chequered existence. However, in time it came to be thought of as the main line, and the Dalmellington line was a branch.

In 1872 a mineral line was opened from Cronberry to Newton-on-Ayr with a branch from Annbank to Holehouse Junction, on the Dalmellington line. The entry at Holehouse faced Dalmellington. Passenger trains from Dalmellington ran as far as Rankinston from 1892.

From April 1917 to January 1918 the Loch Doon Aerial Gunnery School Railway line ran from near Dalmellington station to Dalfarson near Loch Doon.

The ironworks closed in 1921, since which time the mineral traffic on the branch had been devoted to extractive industries alone. The Dalmellington line had long been subordinate to the Stranraer route; the point of divergence via Dalrymple Junction. The branch passenger service closed on 6 April 1964. The line between Falkland Junction and Dalrymple Junction continues in use for Stranraer line passenger services, and mineral trains use the Dalmellington branch to access open cast mining sites near Dalmellington. The trains use the original line as far as Waterside, near Drumgrange, from where a private mineral line climbs into the hills above, and to the north of, Dalmellington. The branch is known now as the Waterside branch.

== Topography ==
Falkland Junction to Drumgrange opened to goods trains 15 May 1856, and passenger trains on 7 August

- Falkland Junction (not a station; point of divergence from original GPK&AR line to Ayr);
- Ayr Townhead; renamed Ayr 1 July 1857; new enlarged station opened a short distance south on 12 January 1886;
- Dalrymple Junction; not a station; point of divergence of Maybole line;
- Maybole Junction (station); situated immediately south of the point of divergence; opened 13 October 1856; closed 1 December 1859;
- Hollybush
- Patna; relocated a short distance south in 1897;

Drumgrange to Sillyhole opened 7 November 1849; (Note: Cobb says 1852, transferred to A&GR 1853)

- Waterside

Sillyhole to Dalmellington opened to goods train 15 May 1856, and passenger trains on 7 August;

- Dalmellington

== Connections to other lines ==
- Ayr to Mauchline Branch at Newton and Hawkhill Junctions
- Ayr and Maybole Junction Railway at Maybole/Dalrymple Junction
- Glasgow, Paisley, Kilmarnock and Ayr Railway at Falkland Junction
- Maidens and Dunure Railway at Alloway Junction

== Sources ==
- Awdry, Christopher (1990). Encyclopaedia of British Railway Companies. Sparkford: Patrick Stephens Ltd. ISBN 1-8526-0049-7. OCLC 19514063. CN 8983.
- Stansfield, G. (1999). Ayrshire & Renfrewshire's Lost Railways. Ochiltree: Stenlake Publishing. ISBN 1-8403-3077-5.
