= List of places in South Ayrshire =

Map of places in South Ayrshire compiled from this list

This List of places in South Ayrshire is a list of links for any town, village, castle, golf course, historic house, lighthouse, nature reserve, reservoir, river and other place of interest in the South Ayrshire council area of Scotland.

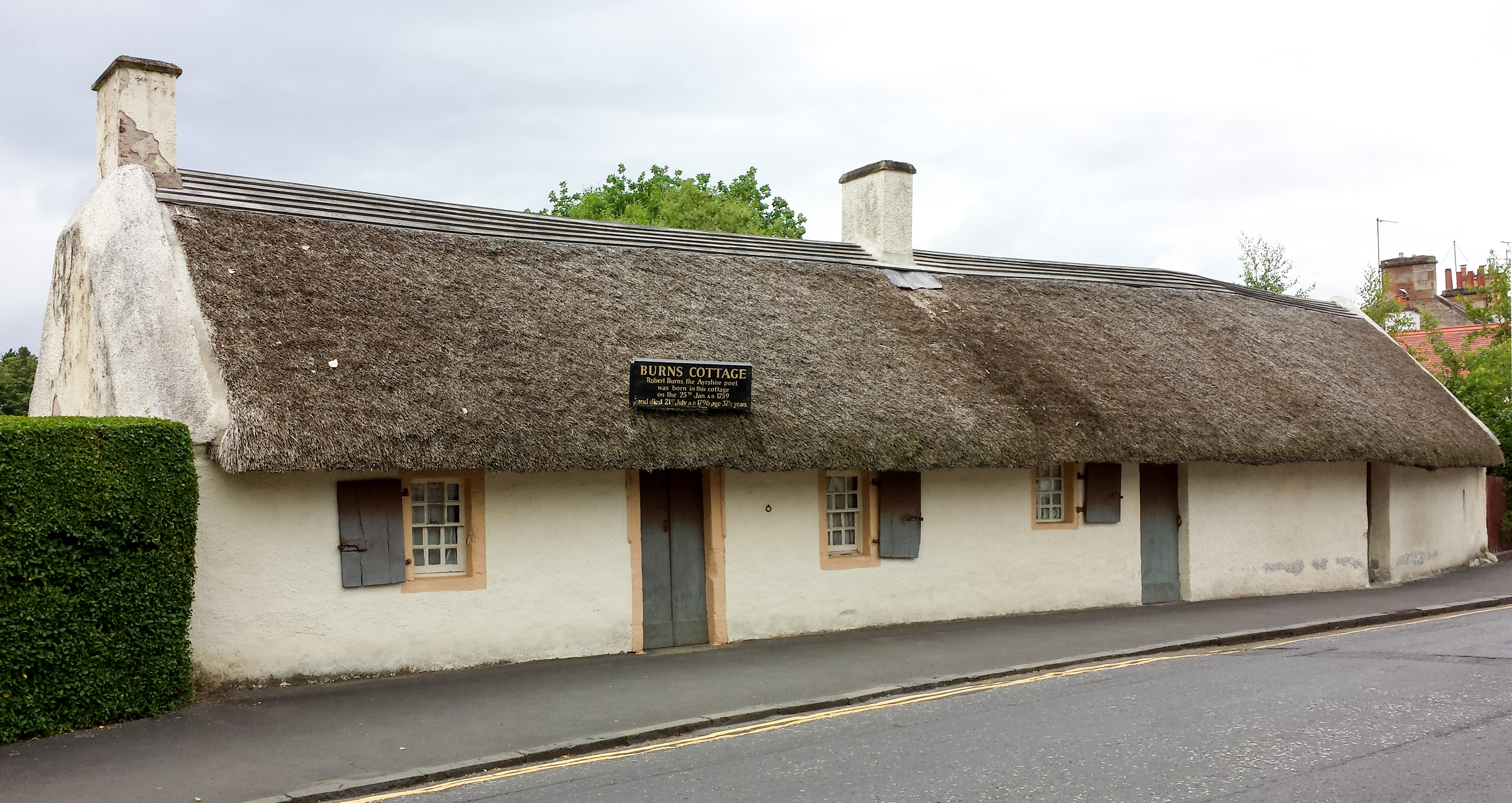
Burns Cottage, Alloway

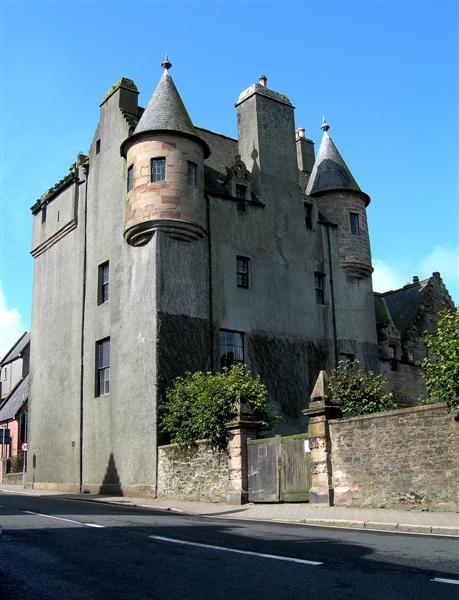
Maybole Castle

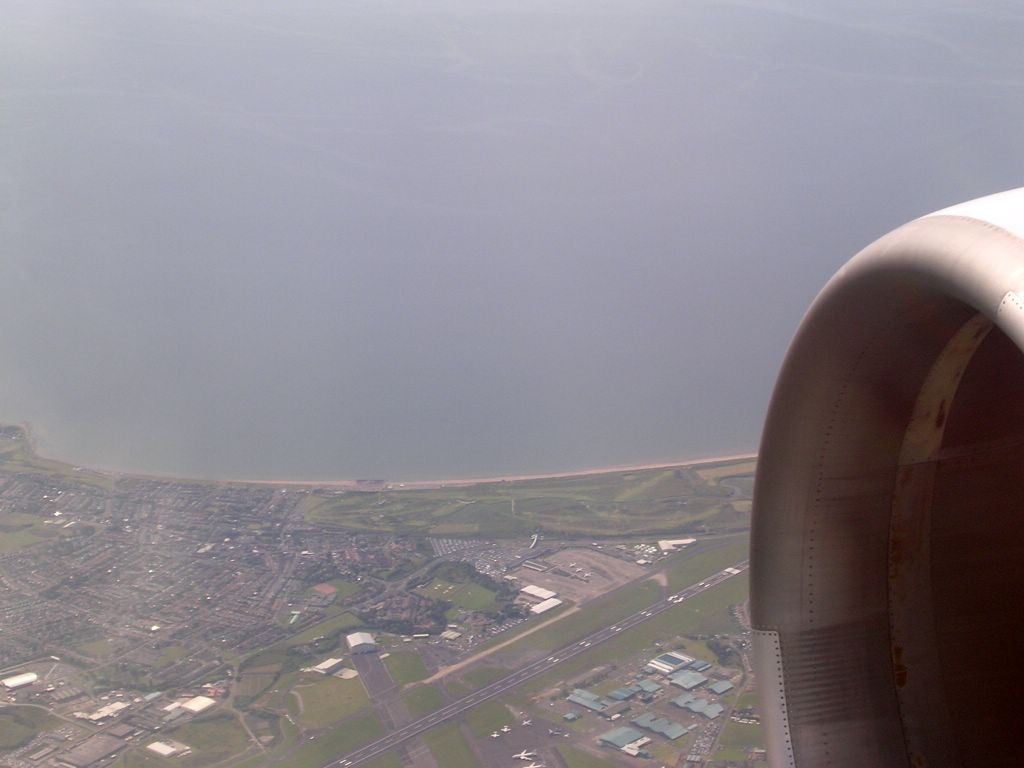
Prestwick from the air

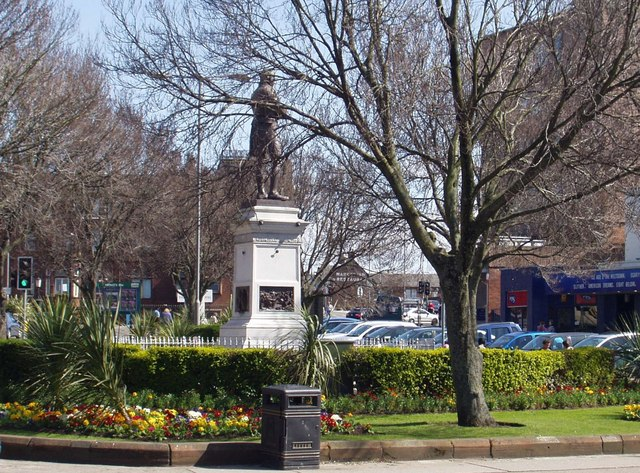
Burns Statue Square, Ayr

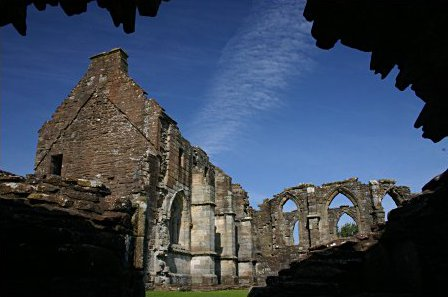
Crossraguel Abbey

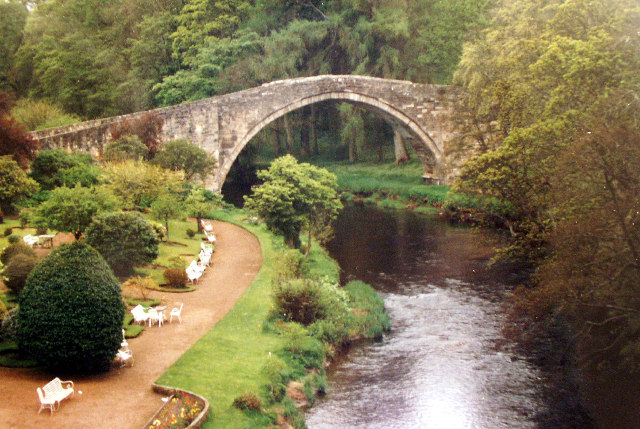
The Auld Brig O' Doon, Alloway

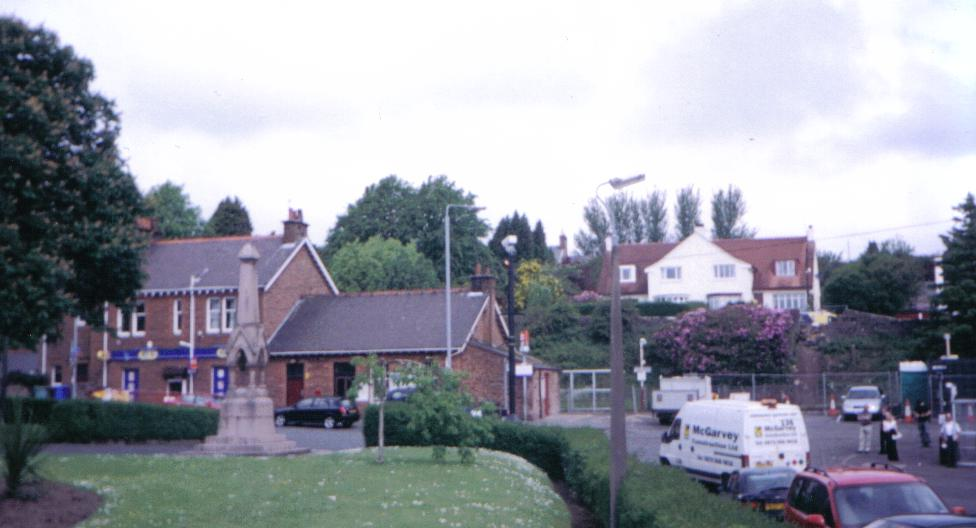
Maybole Railway Station

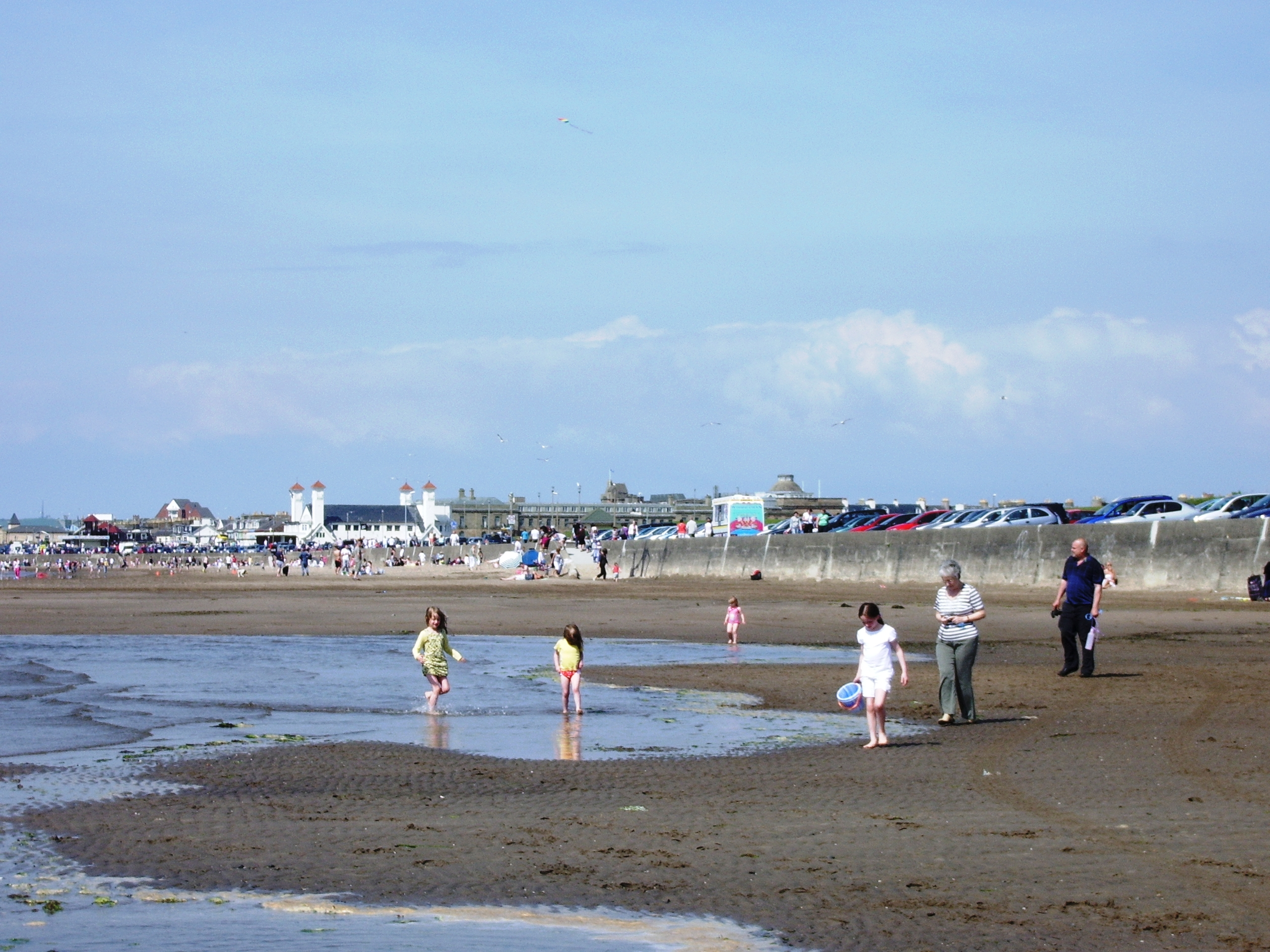
The Beach at Ayr

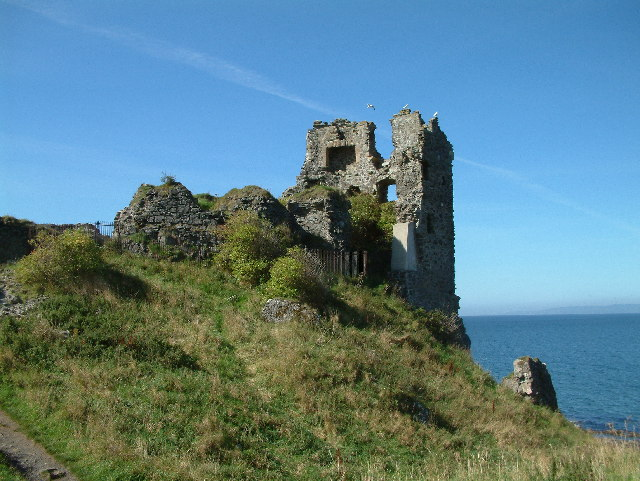
Dunure Castle

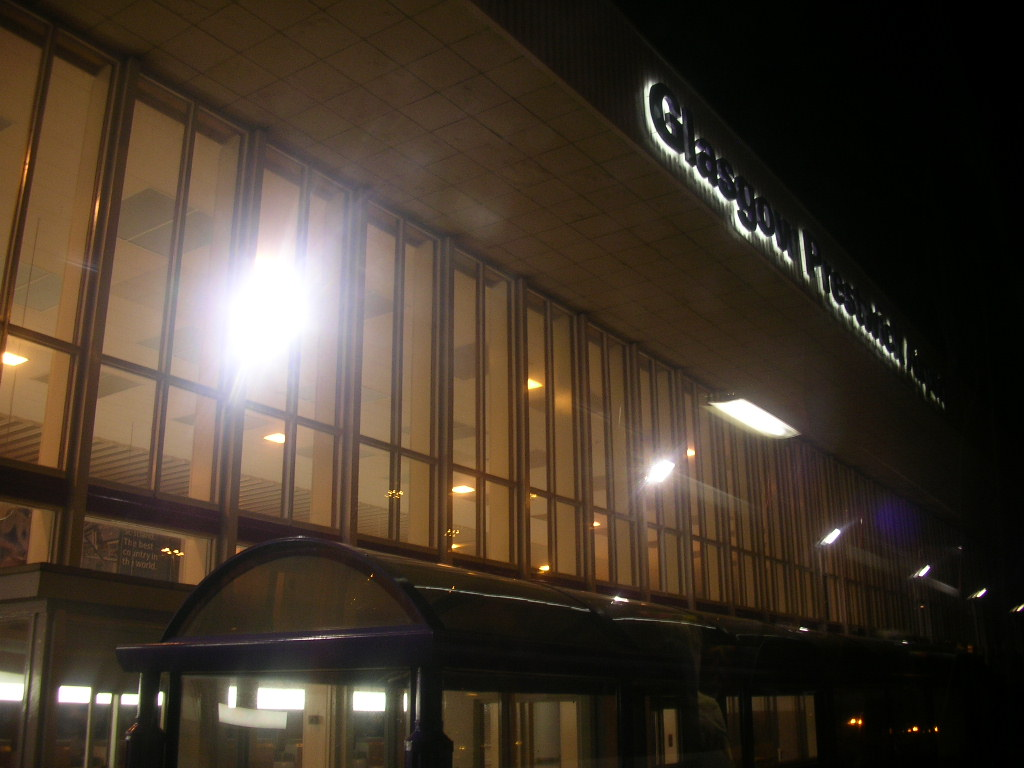
Prestwick Airport Terminal Building

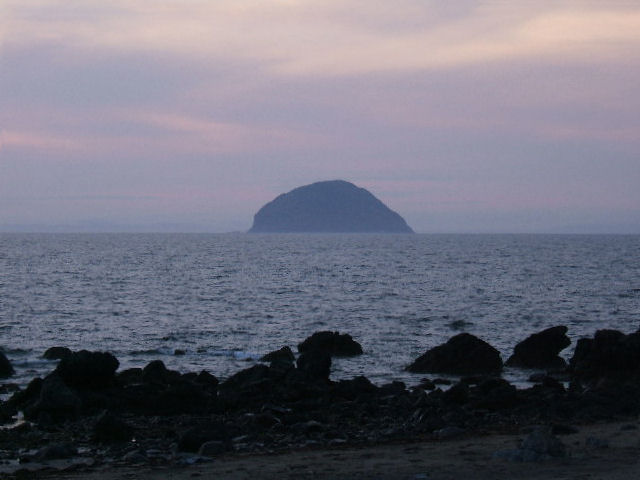
Ailsa Craig, Sunset

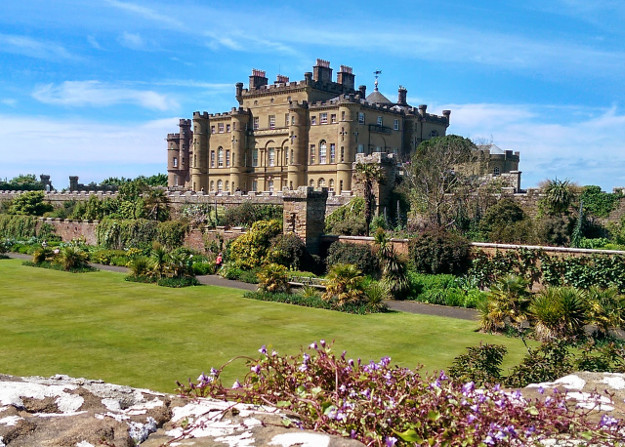
Culzean Castle

== A ==
Ailsa Craig, Alloway, Ayr

== B ==
- Balkissock
- Ballantrae, Ballantrae railway station
- Barassie, Barassie railway station
- Bargany Gardens
- Barr
- Barrhill
- Belston
- Blairquhan

== C ==
- Carrick, Carrick Forest
- Cloyntie
- Colmonell
- Coodham
- Crosshill
- Crossraguel, Crossraguel Abbey
- Culroy
- Culzean, Culzean Castle
- Currarie

== D ==
- Dailly
- Dunure
- Dipple
- Doonholm
- Dowhill
- Drumshang
- Dundonald, Dundonald Castle
- Dunure, Dunure Castle, Dunure railway station

== E ==
- Electric Brae

== F ==
- Failford
- Fisherton

== G ==
- Girvan, Girvan and Portpatrick Junction Railway
- Glasgow Prestwick Airport, Glasgow Prestwick Airport railway station
- Grimmet

== H ==
- Heads of Ayr, Heads of Ayr Holiday Camp railway station
- Hersonford

== K ==
- Kirkmichael
- Kirkoswald, Kirkoswald Parish Church
- Knokdolian
- Knoweside

== L ==
- Ladybank
- Lendalfoot

== M ==
- Maidens, Maidens and Dunure Light Railway
- Mainholm
- Maxwelton, Maxwelton Braes
- Maybole, Maybole and Girvan Railway, Maybole railway station, Maybole Castle
- Merkland
- Minishant
- Monkton
- Mossblown
- Muirhead

== N ==
- Newark
- New Prestwick

== O ==
- Old Dailly

== P ==
- Penkill
- Pinmore
- Pinwherry
- Prestwick, Prestwick Golf Club, Prestwick Town railway station

== R ==
- Rosemount

== S ==
- Saint Quivox
- Souter Johnnie's Cottage
- Straiton
- Suachrie
- Sawny Bean's Cave

== T ==
- Tarbolton, Tarbolton railway station
- Tormitchell
- Troon, Troon railway station, Troon (old) railway station, Troon (Harbour) railway station
- Turnberry, Turnberry Castle, Turnberry Golf Course, Turnberry lighthouse, Turnberry railway station

== W ==
- Water of Girvan

== See also ==
- List of places in Scotland
