= Heads of Ayr =

Heads of Ayr may refer to:

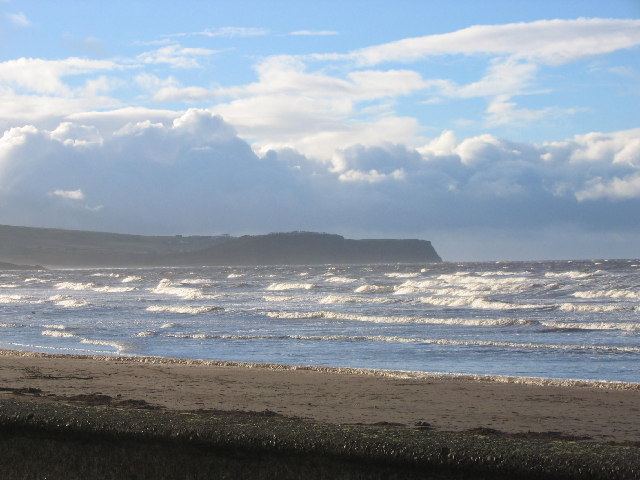
The Heads of Ayr

- Heads of Ayr (headland), South Ayrshire, Scotland, UK; a headland, see List of United Kingdom locations: He-Hem
- Heads of Ayr, South Ayrshire, Ayrshire, Scotland, UK; a locality, see List of places in South Ayrshire
- Heads of Ayr (W174), a conservancy site, see List of Nature Conservation Review sites
- Heads of Ayr (holiday camp), Ayrshire, Scotland, UK; a holiday resort
- Heads of Ayr Holiday Camp railway station, Ayrshire, Scotland, UK; a defunct rail station
- Heads of Ayr railway station, Ayrshire, Scotland, UK; a defunct rail station

== See also ==
- Ayr (disambiguation)
