= Alloway railway station =

Disused railway station in Alloway, Ayrshire

Alloway
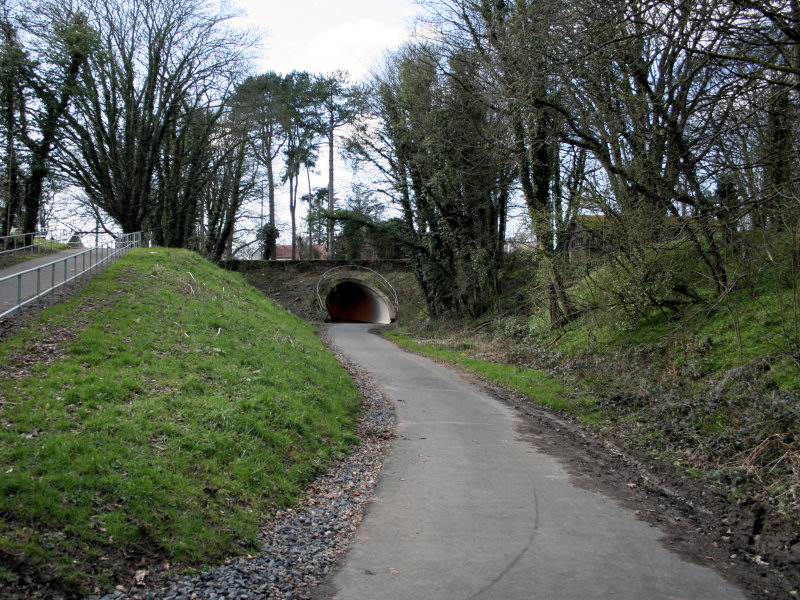
- The site of Alloway looking west in 2008

General information
- Location: Alloway, South Ayrshire; Scotland
- Coordinates: 55.4285°N 4.6355°W
- Grid reference: NS332181
- Platforms: 2

Other information
- Status: Disused

History
- Original company: Maidens and Dunure Light Railway
- Pre-grouping: Glasgow and South Western Railway
- Post-grouping: London, Midland and Scottish Railway

Key dates
- 17 May 1906: Opened
- 1 December 1930: Closed
- 4 July 1932: Re-opened
- 1 June 1933: Closed
- 1968: Line closed and lifted
Location

Alloway railway station was a railway station serving the village of Alloway, South Ayrshire, Scotland. The station was part of the Maidens and Dunure Light Railway.

== History ==
The station opened on 17 May 1906. It closed on 1 December 1930 and reopened on 4 July 1932 when a holiday camp was opened in the Heads of Ayr, however it closed again on 31 May 1933.

Despite being closed the station site was host to two LMS caravans from 1933 to 1939.

Although the line through the station reopened again in the summer of 1947 to coincide with the opening of a new Heads of Ayr station serving the newly opened Butlins, this only served the camp and Alloway station did not reopen. The line through the station closed for the final time on 14 September 1968.

Preceding station	Historical railways	Following station
Heads of Ayr; 1906 - 1933; Line and station closed	Glasgow and South Western Railway; Maidens and Dunure Light Railway	Ayr; Line closed, station open
