= Heads of Ayr railway station =

Former railway station in Scotland

Coordinates: 55.4263°N 4.7114°W

Heads of Ayr

General information
- Location: Heads of Ayr, Ayrshire; Scotland
- Grid reference: NS285180
- Platforms: 1

Other information
- Status: Disused

History
- Original company: Maidens and Dunure Light Railway
- Pre-grouping: Glasgow and South Western Railway
- Post-grouping: London, Midland and Scottish Railway

Key dates
- 17 May 1906: Opened
- 1 December 1930: Closed
- 4 July 1932: Reopened
- 1 June 1933: Closed
Location

Heads of Ayr railway station was a railway station serving the Heads of Ayr, South Ayrshire, Scotland. The station was part of the Maidens and Dunure Light Railway.

== History ==
The station opened on 17 May 1906. It closed on 1 December 1930 and reopened on 4 July 1932 when a holiday camp was opened in the Heads of Ayr, however it closed again on 1 June 1933. Upon the opening of a Butlins holiday camp in the area, a new Heads of Ayr Holiday Camp station was opened a mile east of this station on 17 May 1947. and closed on 16th Sept 1968

Preceding station	Historical railways	Following station
Dunure; Line and station closed	Glasgow and South Western Railway; Maidens and Dunure Light Railway	Alloway; Line and station closed
