= Maidens railway station =

Former railway station in Scotland

Coordinates: 55.3304°N 4.8073°W

Maidens
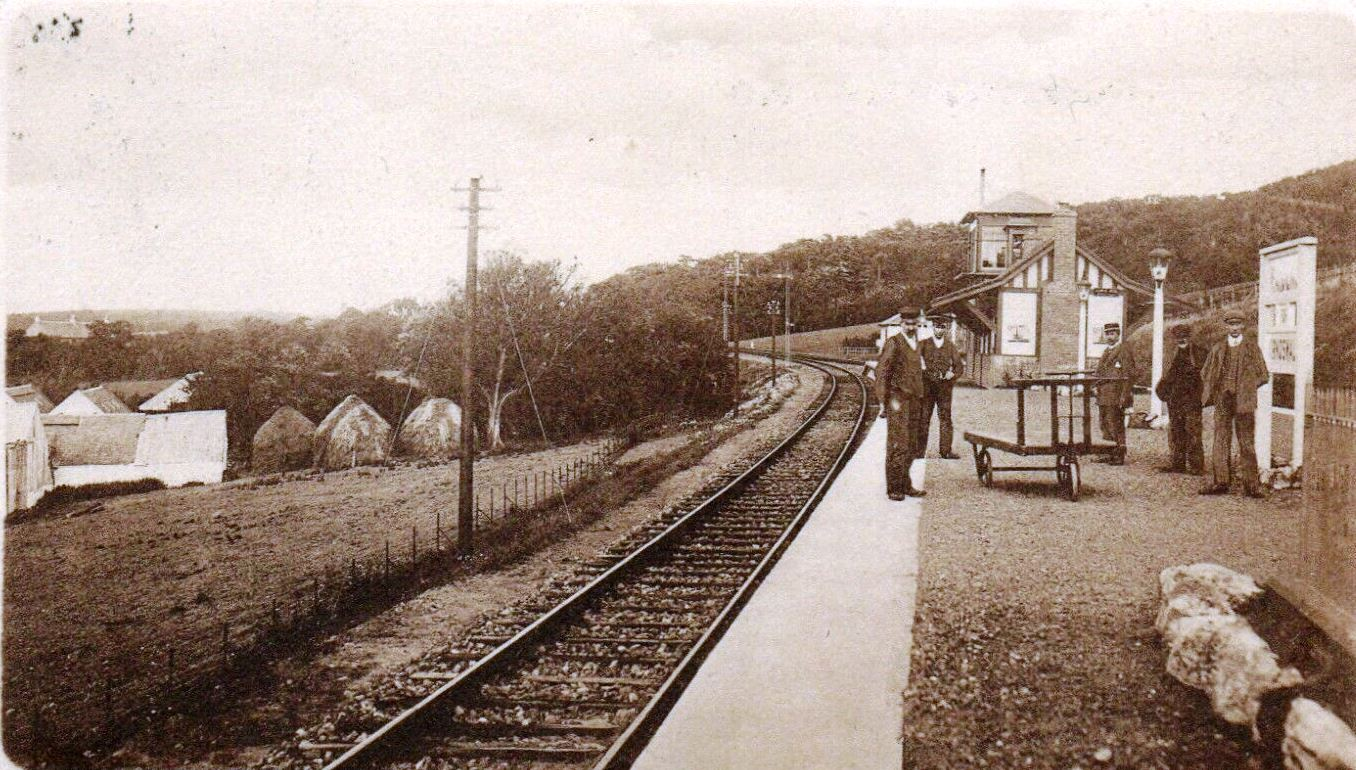

General information
- Location: Maidens, Ayrshire; Scotland
- Grid reference: NS220076
- Platforms: 1

Other information
- Status: Disused

History
- Original company: Maidens and Dunure Light Railway
- Pre-grouping: Glasgow and South Western Railway

Key dates
- 17 May 1906: Opened
- 1 December 1930: Closed
- 4 July 1932: Reopened
- 1 June 1933: Closed
Location

Maidens railway station was a railway station serving the village of Maidens, South Ayrshire, Scotland. The station was part of the Maidens and Dunure Light Railway.

== History ==
The station opened on 17 May 1906. It closed on 1 December 1930, but reopened briefly between 4 July 1932 and 1 June 1933.

The station had a single island platform with a small wooden building with overhanging canopies. The former station site is located next to the A719, a short distance east of the village of the same name, however the site is now a caravan park leaving no remaining trace of the station.

Preceding station	Historical railways	Following station
Turnberry; Line and station closed	Glasgow and South Western Railway; Maidens and Dunure Light Railway	Glenside; Line and station closed
