= Knoweside railway station =

Former railway station in Scotland

Coordinates: 55.3768°N 4.7575°W

Knoweside

General information
- Location: Knoweside, Ayrshire; Scotland
- Grid reference: NS253126
- Platforms: 1

Other information
- Status: Disused

History
- Original company: Maidens and Dunure Light Railway
- Pre-grouping: Glasgow and South Western Railway
- Post-grouping: London, Midland and Scottish Railway

Key dates
- 17 May 1906: Opened
- 1 December 1930: Closed
- 4 July 1932: Reopened
- 1 June 1933: Closed
Location

Knoweside railway station was a railway station serving the village of Knoweside, South Ayrshire, Scotland. The station was part of the Maidens and Dunure Light Railway.

== History ==
The station opened on 17 May 1906. It closed on 1 December 1930, but reopened briefly between 4 July 1932 and 1 June 1933.

Today the site of the station is a caravan park. Near to the station is the Electric Brae.

Preceding station	Historical railways	Following station
Balchriston Level Crossing Halt; Line and station closed	Glasgow and South Western Railway; Maidens and Dunure Light Railway	Dunure; Line and station closed
