= Balchriston Level Crossing Halt railway station =

Disused railway station in Ayrshire, Scotland

Coordinates: 55.36362°N 4.75552°W

Balchriston Level Crossing Halt

General information
- Location: Near Culzean Castle, Ayrshire; Scotland
- Grid reference: NS253111
- Platforms: 1

Other information
- Status: Disused

History
- Original company: Maidens and Dunure Light Railway
- Pre-grouping: Glasgow and South Western Railway
- Post-grouping: LMS

Key dates
- 17 May 1906: Opened
- 1 December 1930: Closed
Location

Balchriston Level Crossing Halt was a railway halt near Culzean Castle, South Ayrshire, Scotland. The halt was part of the Maidens and Dunure Light Railway.

== History ==
Open in 1906 it closed on 1 December 1930. As the name might imply, it was next to a level crossing.

Preceding station	Historical railways	Following station
Glenside; Line and station closed	Glasgow and South Western Railway; Maidens and Dunure Light Railway	Knoweside; Line and station closed
