= Maidens, South Ayrshire =

Coordinates: 55°19′59″N 4°49′07″W

Maidens
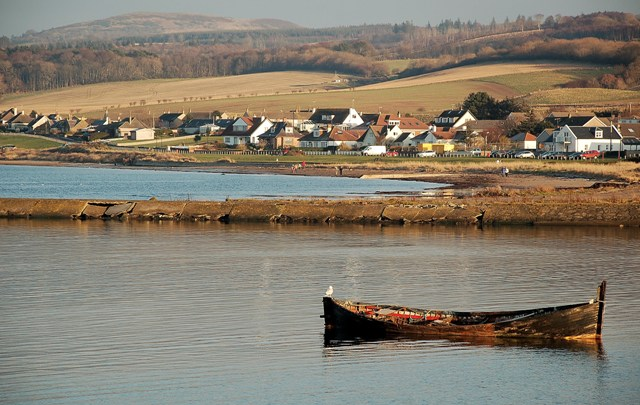
- View of Maidens

- Location within South Ayrshire
- Population: 567
- OS grid reference: NS215080
  - Edinburgh: 77 mi (124 km)
  - London: 327 mi (526 km)
- Council area: South Ayrshire
- Lieutenancy area: Ayrshire and Arran
- Country: Scotland
- Sovereign state: United Kingdom
- Post town: GIRVAN
- Postcode district: KA26
- Police: Scotland
- Fire: Scottish
- Ambulance: Scottish
- UK Parliament: Ayr, Carrick and Cumnock
- Scottish Parliament: Carrick, Cumnock and Doon Valley

Maidens is a village in the Kirkoswald parish of Ayrshire, Scotland. Situated on the coast of the Firth of Clyde at the southern end of Maidenhead Bay, a series of rocks known as the "Maidens” form a natural harbour. The village lies 2 miles (3 km) north of the ruinous Turnberry Castle, ancient seat of the Earls of Carrick, and 5 miles (8 km) west of Maybole. It formerly had its own railway station on the Maidens and Dunure Light Railway. In 1991, Maidens had a population of 567.

== Fishing ==
The Annual Reports of the Fishery Board for Scotland provide an insight into the state of fishing from Maidens in the years before the First World War.

Fishery Statistics

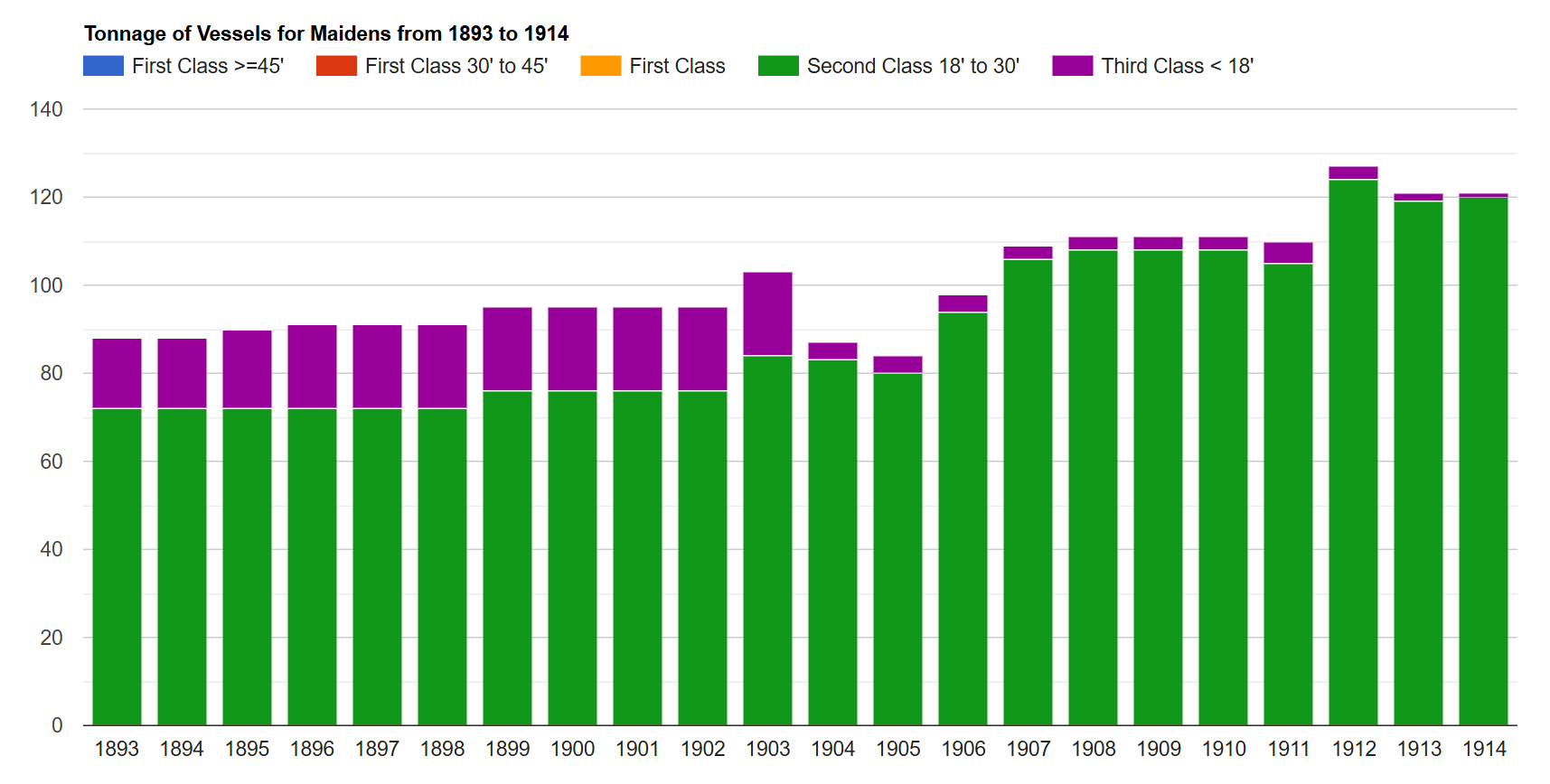
Tonnage of vessels

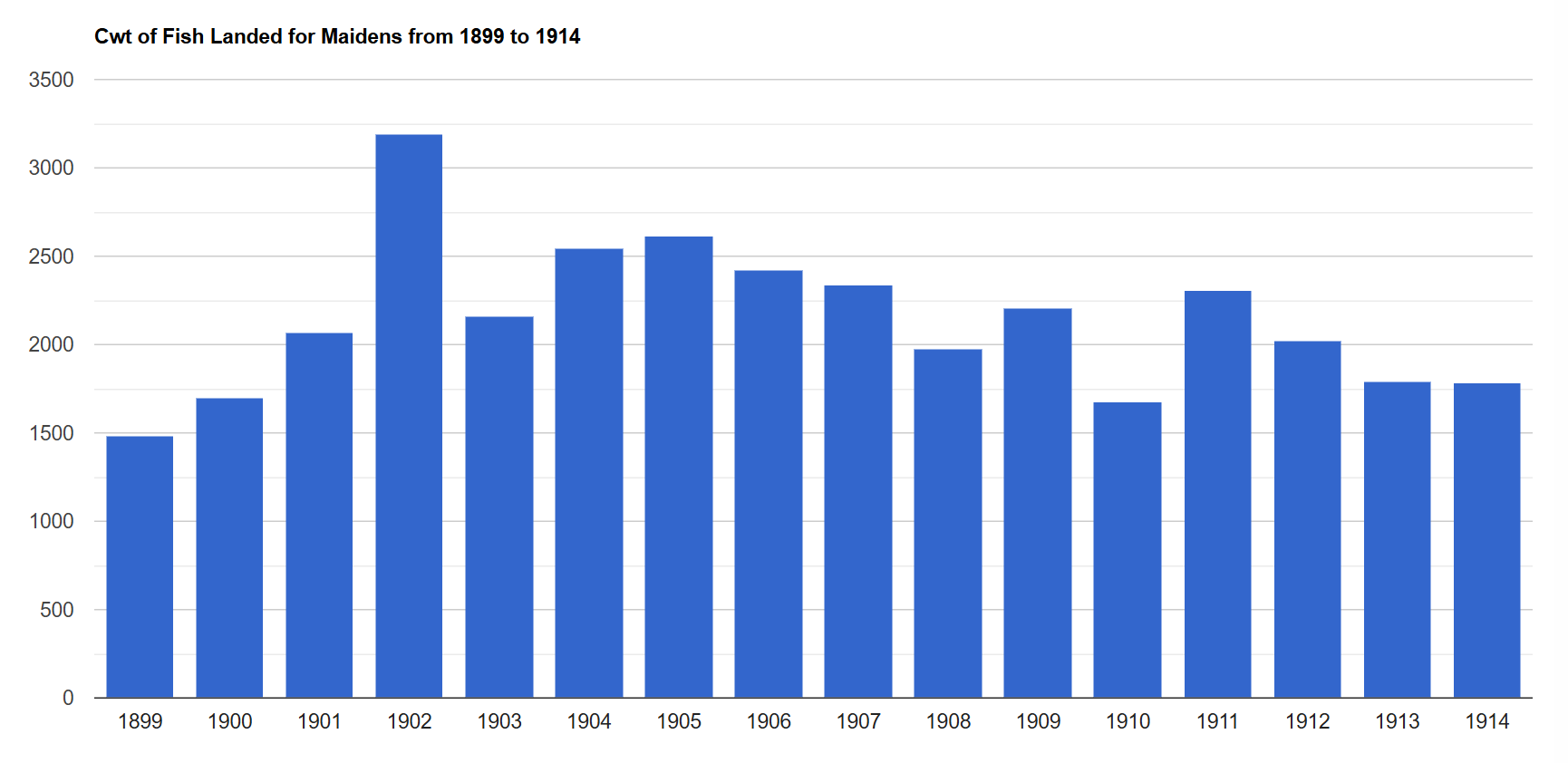
Cwt of fish landed

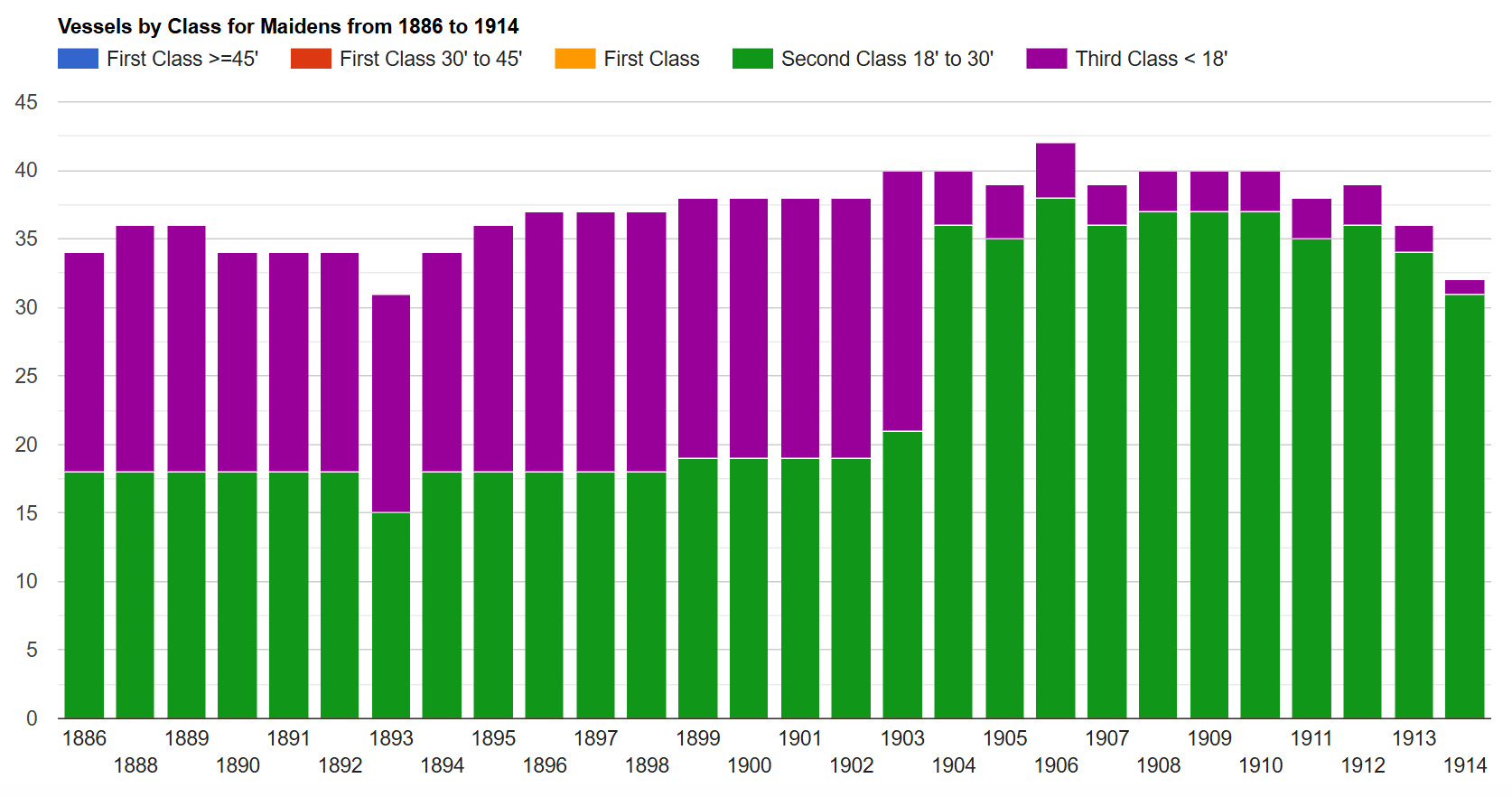
Vessels by class

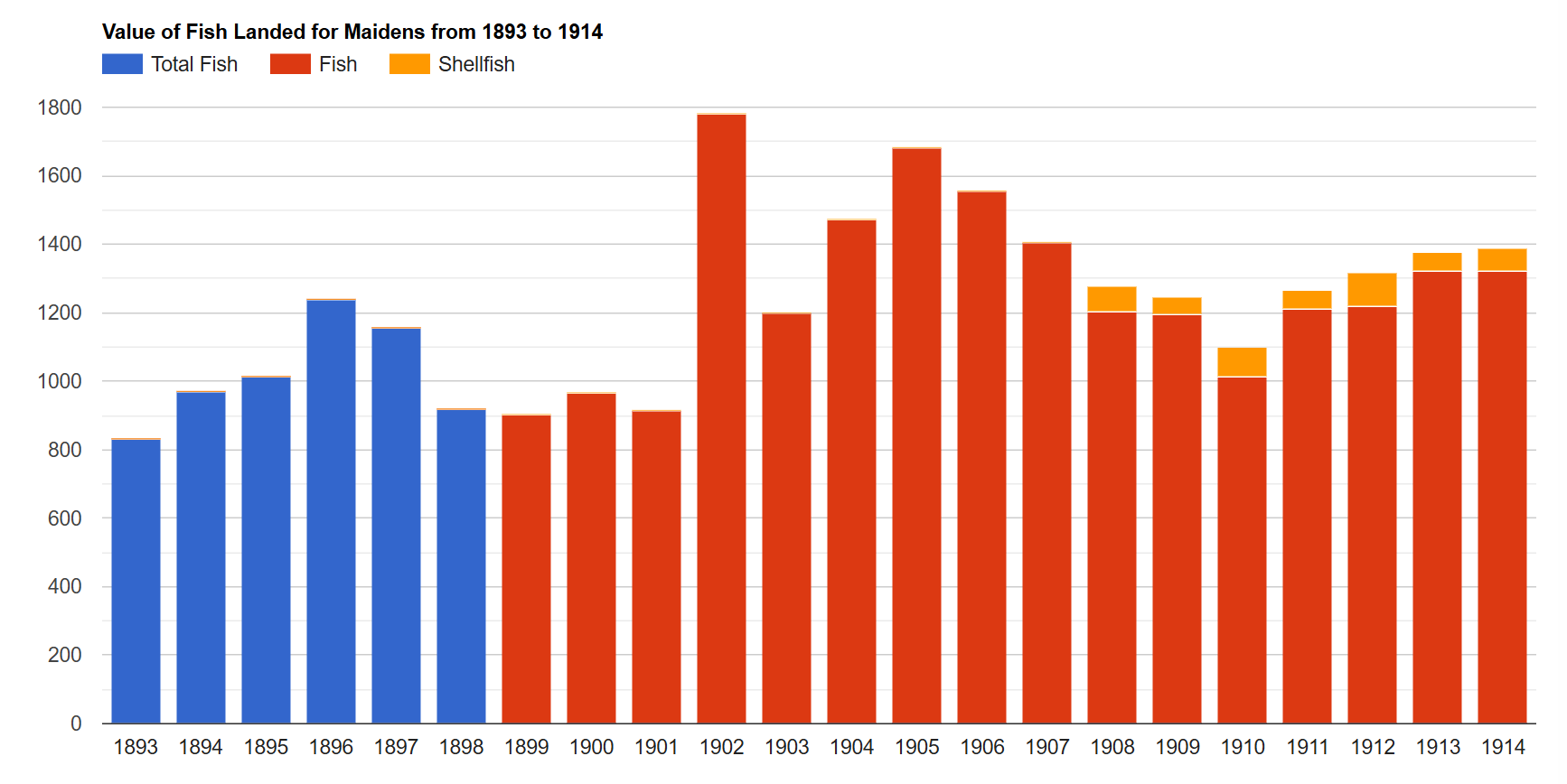
Value (£) of fish landed

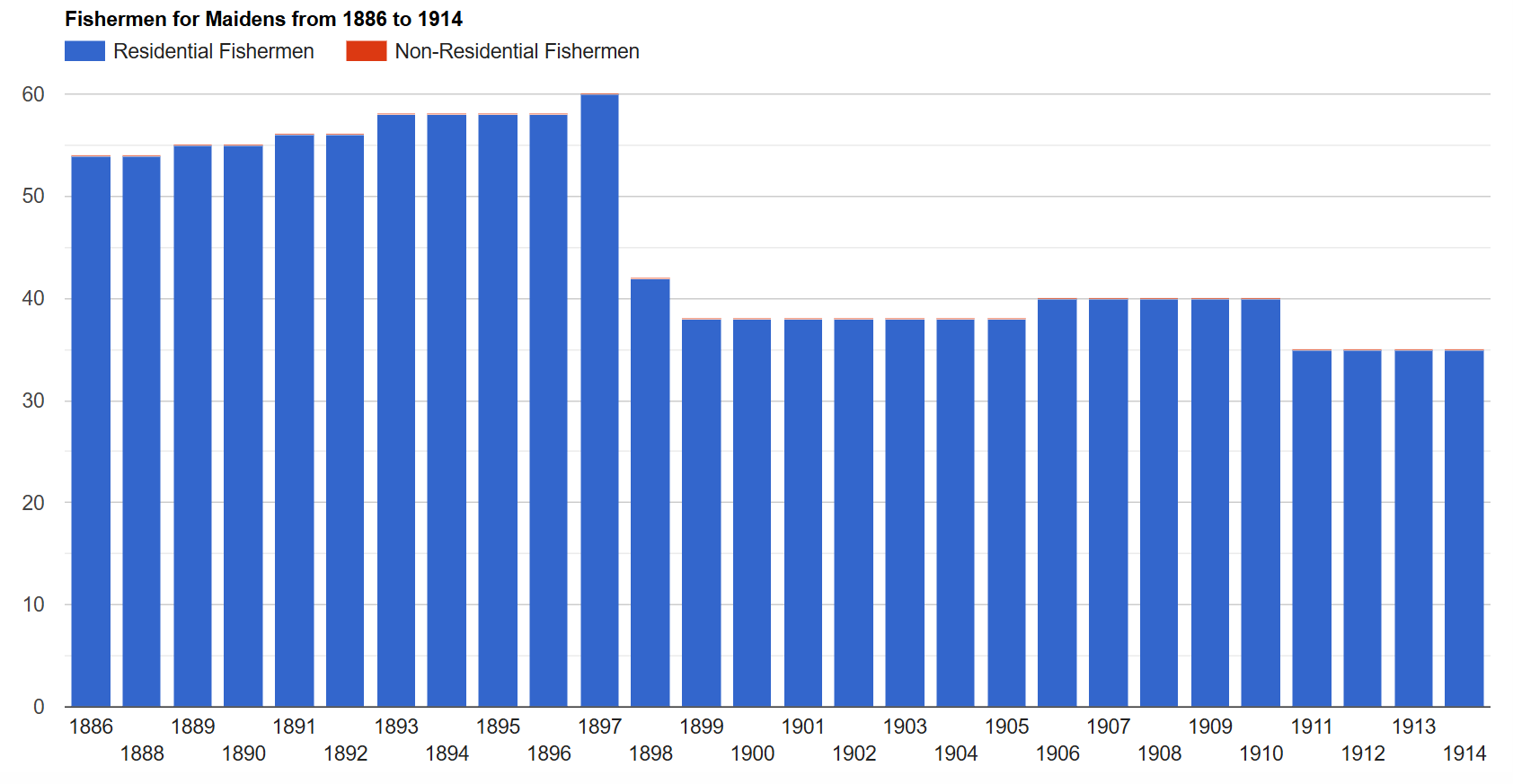
Fishermen

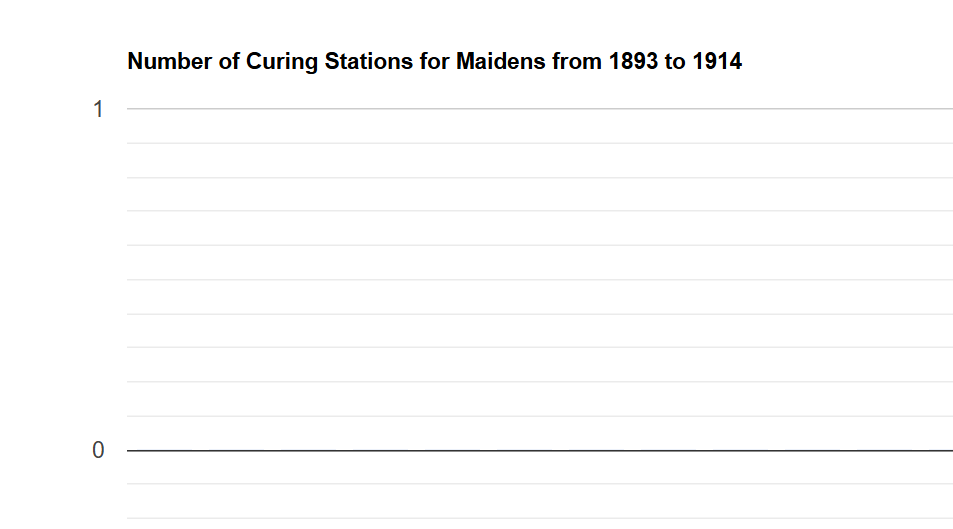
Placeholder- no curing stations
