= Dunure =

Village in Ayrshire, Scotland

Coordinates: 55.4°N 4.75°W

Dunure: Scottish Gaelic: Dùn Iùbhair; Scots: Dunure
- Village
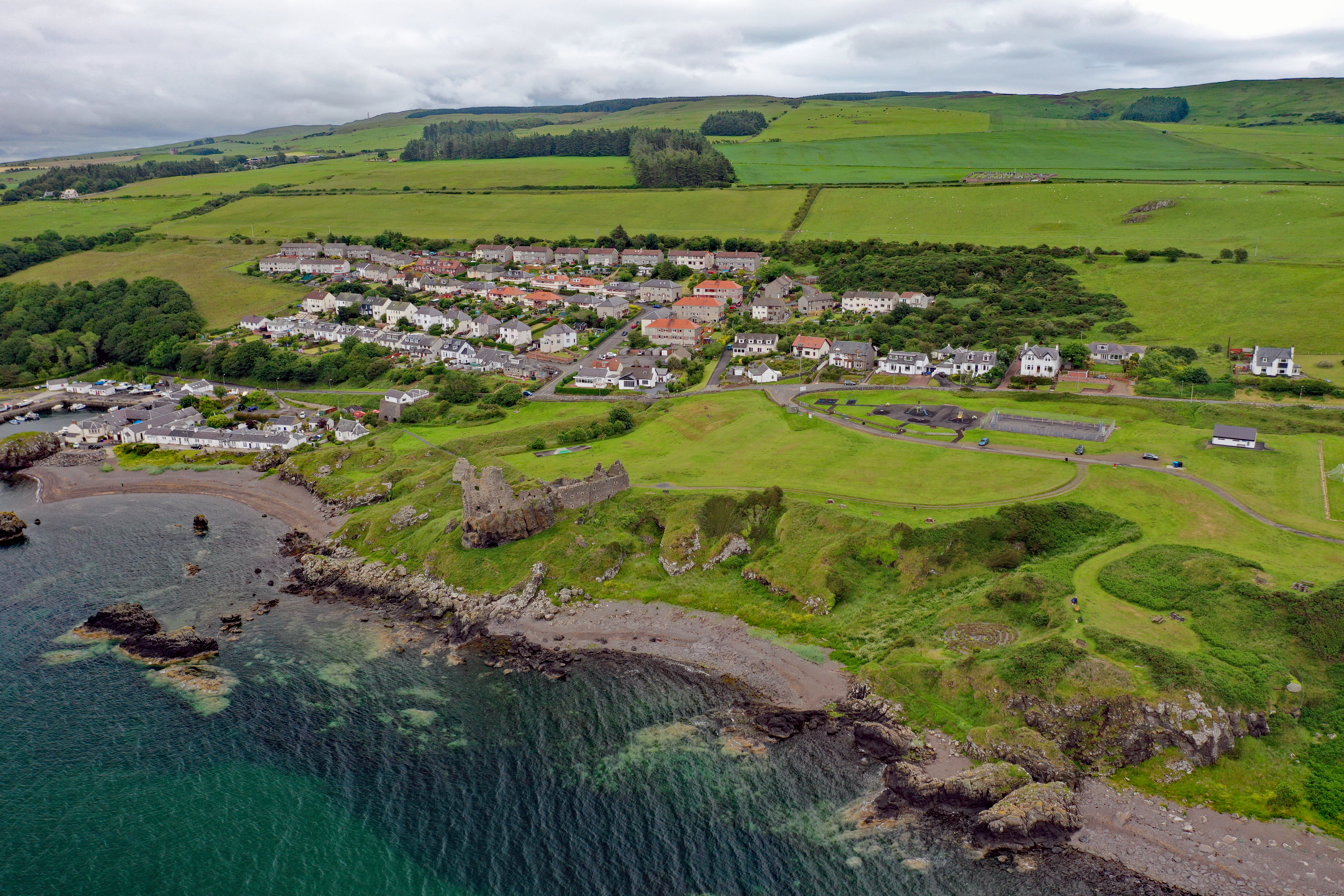
- Aerial view of Dunure and nearby Fisherton

- Location within South Ayrshire
- Population: (2020)
- OS grid reference: NS250158
- Civil parish: Maybole
- Council area: South Ayrshire
- Lieutenancy area: Ayrshire and Arran
- Country: Scotland
- Sovereign state: United Kingdom
- Post town: Ayr
- Postcode district: KA7
- Dialling code: 01292
- Police: Scotland
- Fire: Scottish
- Ambulance: Scottish
- UK Parliament: Ayr, Carrick and Cumnock
- Scottish Parliament: Carrick, Cumnock and Doon Valley

Dunure (Scottish Gaelic: Dùn Iùbhair, meaning Yew Hill) is a small village in the South Ayrshire area of Scotland, situated about five miles (eight kilometres) from Ayr. It is located on the coast of the Firth of Clyde, and is near to Maybole, south of Ayr. The village is most notable for its ruined medieval castle in a clifftop setting, its small former fishing harbour nearby, and (on the opposite side of the castle from the harbour) a small, modern plant maze known as the Dunure Labyrinth.

Since 2012, Dunure, along with Galloway and Southern Ayrshire, is part of the UNESCO World Network of Biosphere Reserves.

== Overview and history ==
=== Early origins ===
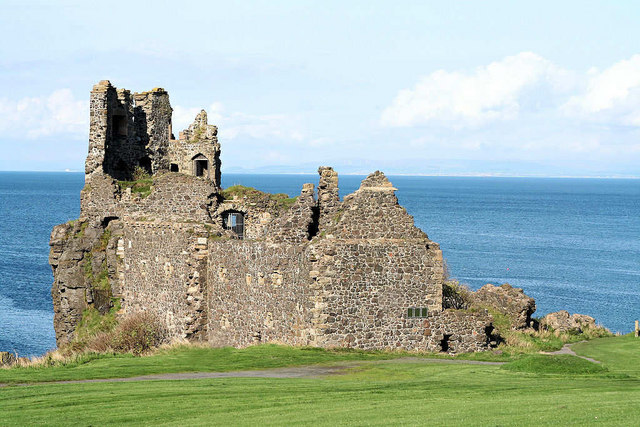
Dunure Castle and headland

The first buildings in the lower Dunure village were erected in the early nineteenth century, not long after improvements to the local harbour in 1811. Kennedy Hall dates from 1881 and Dunure House from around 1800. Limekilns are a common feature of small harbours and Dunure has a fine specimen at the village play park.

Fisherton Church was erected in 1938 as a chapel of ease for Dunure and district. It was rebuilt and extended in 1912. Dunduff Castle stands above Fisherton; originally a 15th-century structure, it was altered and extended in the 1980s for use as a private house. The remains of a prehistoric earthwork, the Dane's Hill, are in a nearby field. The ruins of the pre-reformation Kirkbride church and cemetery are nearby, abandoned since the parish was combined with that of Maybole.

=== Dunure Castle ===
The substantial ruins of the infamous Dunure Castle are in the village. Dunduff Castle above Fisherton Primary School has been rebuilt and is now a private home; the old parish cemetery and pre-reformation church ruins lie near Dunduff Farm.

John Keppie, a colleague of the renowned Glasgow artist, architect and type designer Charles Rennie Mackintosh, rented the house of Mainslea and a small cottage in its back garden opposite Dunure Castle for what was known as “The Roaring Camp”, a holiday home popular with young women friends of theirs from the Glasgow School of Art. It was from this base that Mackintosh set out on a sketching expedition to the abbey of Crossraguel, Baltersan and Maybole in 1895.

== Landmarks ==
The mounted skeleton of the famous Clydesdale horse 'Baron of Buchlyvie' is a popular attraction for the Kelvingrove Museum and Art Galleries in Glasgow. The Baron finished his days at Dunure Mains Farm and was originally buried there.

A labyrinth has been constructed in a hollow on the headland overlooked by the castle in May 2008 led by local community councillor Andy Guthrie. It is looked after by volunteers from the village and pagan groups from around Scotland and is open all year.

The Electric Brae is located on the main road (where national speed limit of 60mph applies) near the village: its nickname comes from the optical illusion that it is going slightly uphill instead of down.

== Harbour ==
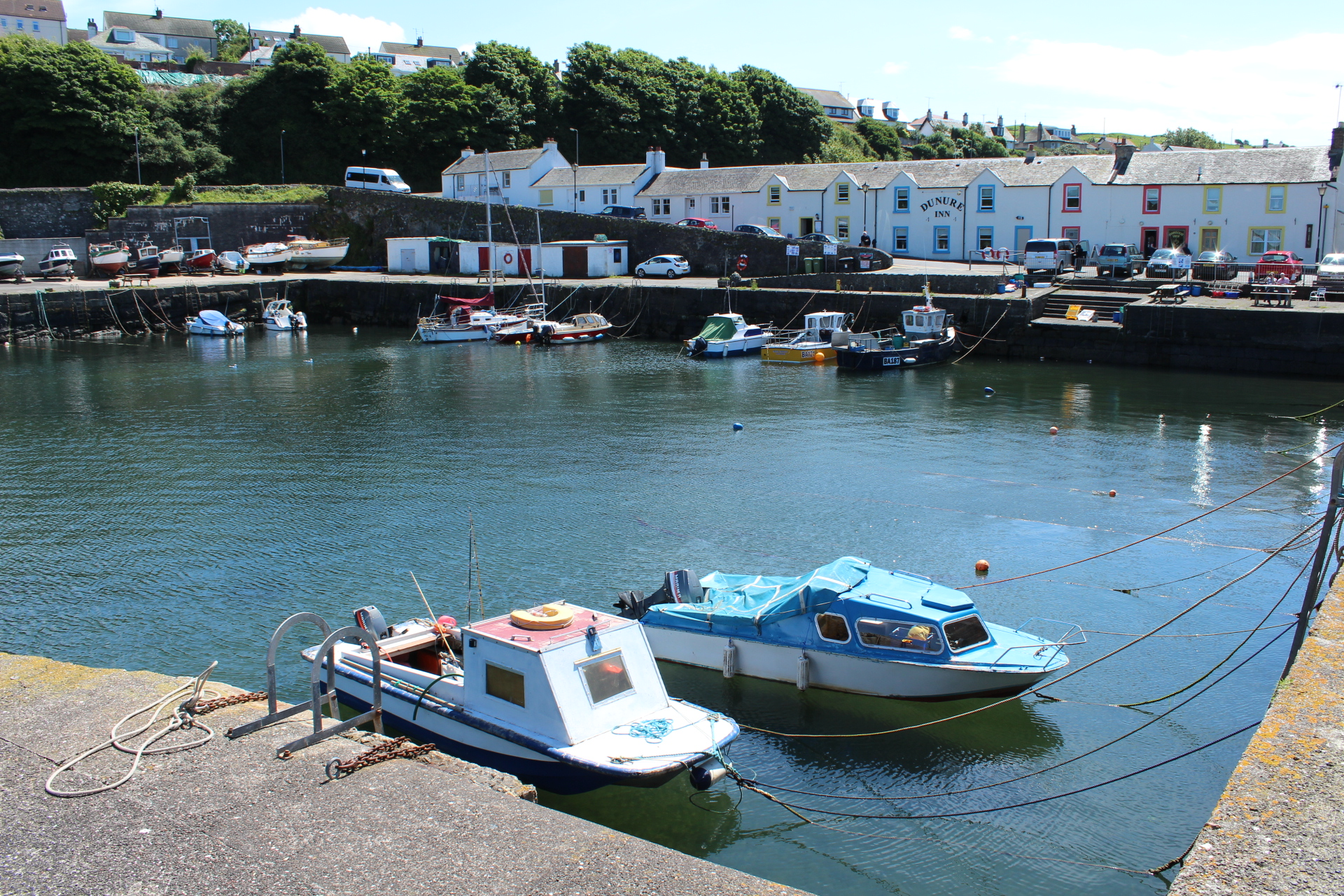
Dunure Harbour, with part of the village in the background

The harbour is a roughly square basin with a breakwater quay, topped off by a locally characteristic cylindrical stone harbour light. The Earl of Cassillis improved the harbour at a cost of £50,000 in 1811, making the location more attractive for fishing. The depth of the water in the harbour is 12 feet (3.5 metres) at ordinary spring tides, but could be artificially increased to almost 30 ft (9 m). William Aiton records in 1808 that the sole costs of the improvements to Dunure harbour were borne by Thomas Kennedy of Dunure Esq.

== Demography ==
=== Economy and fishing ===
The high point of the fishing fleet in Dunure coincided with the great days of the herring fishery in the Clyde, since which time the fleet has declined and now consists of half a dozen small vessels concentrating on catching brown crabs and lobsters. Dunure is probably the best preserved of the fishing villages on the Clyde. The Annual Reports of the Fishery Board for Scotland provide an insight into the state of fishing from Dunure in the years before the First World War.

Fishery Statistics

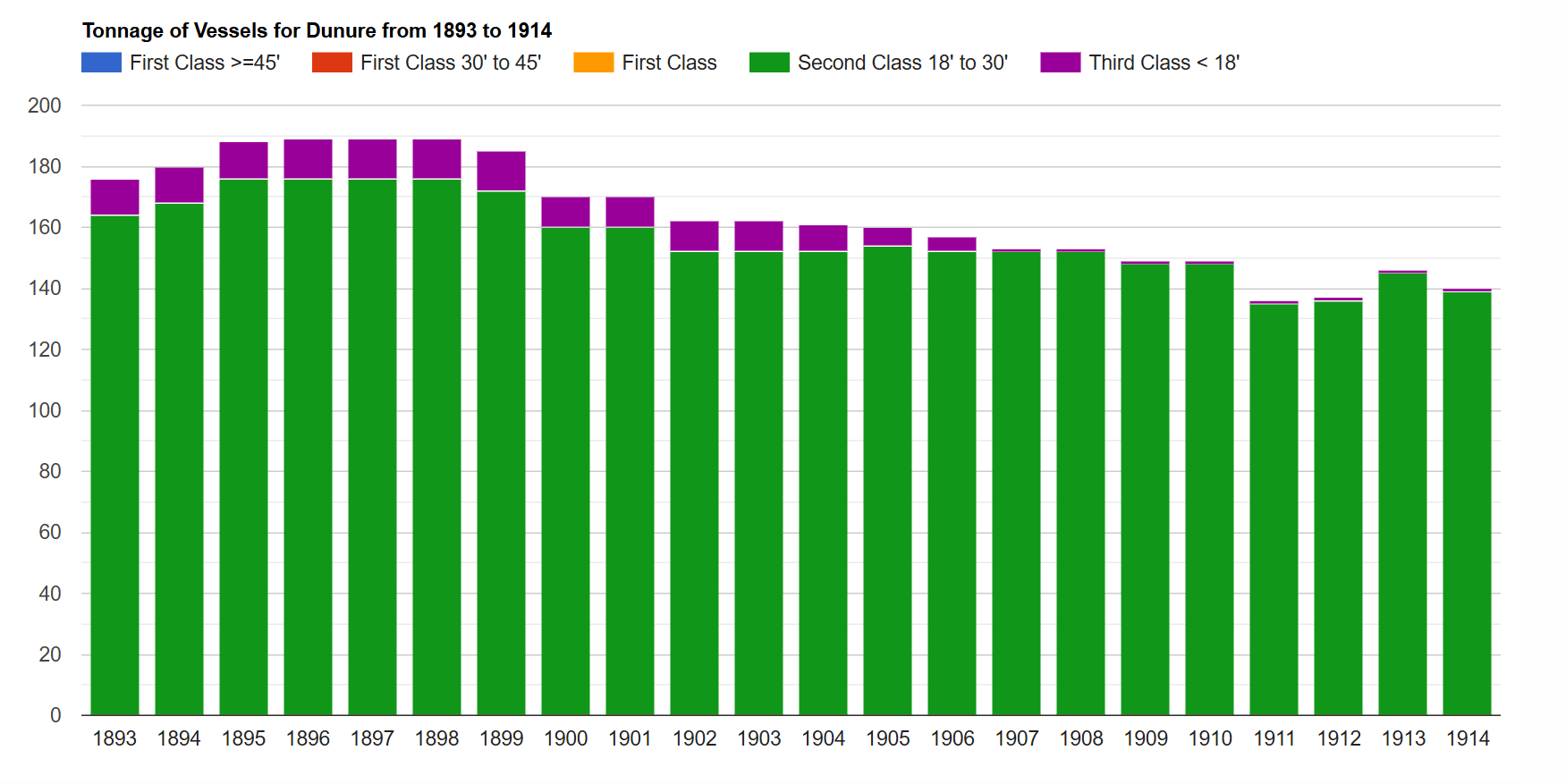
Tonnage of vessels

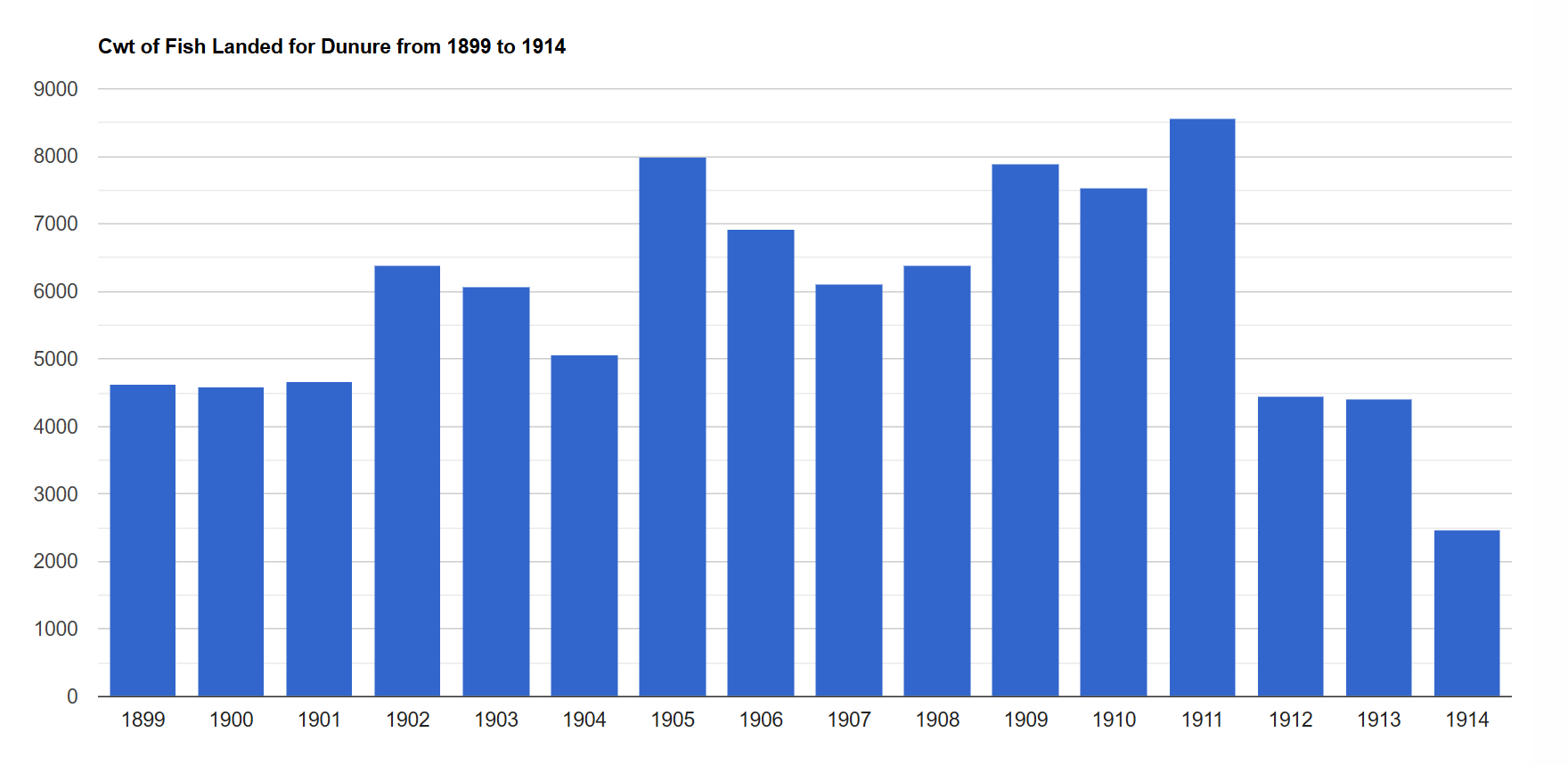
Cwt of fish landed

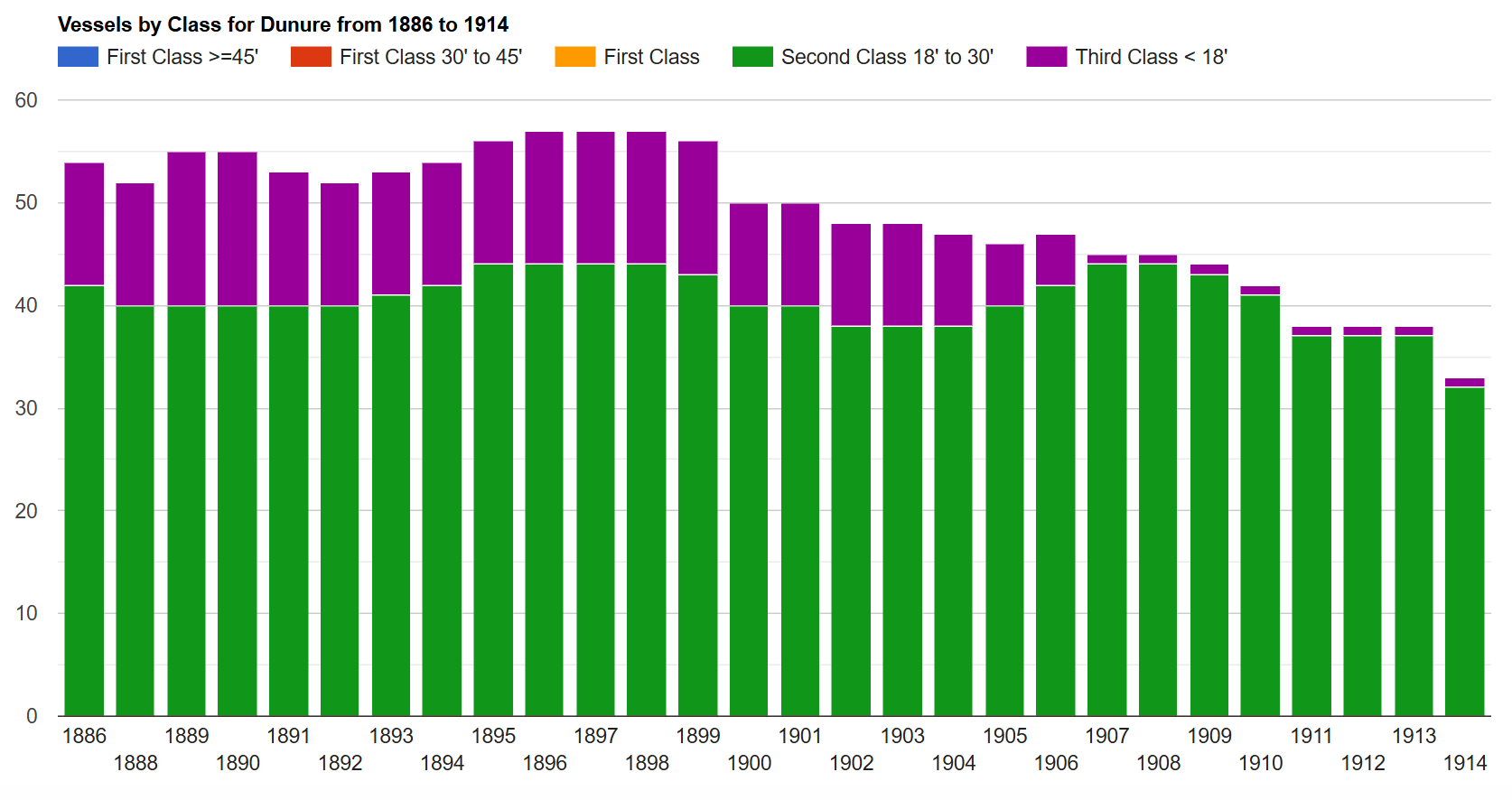
Vessels by class

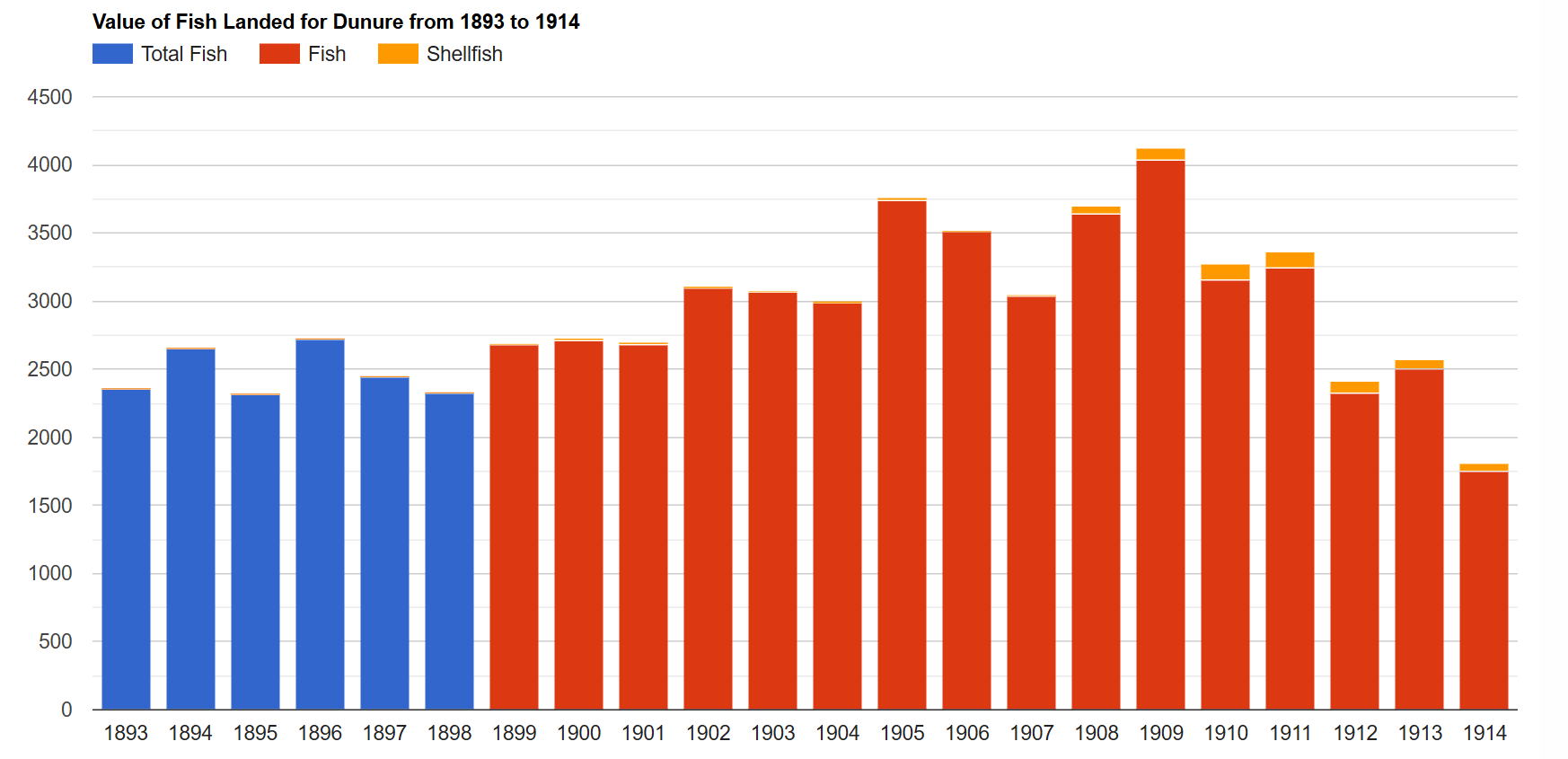
Value (£) of fish landed

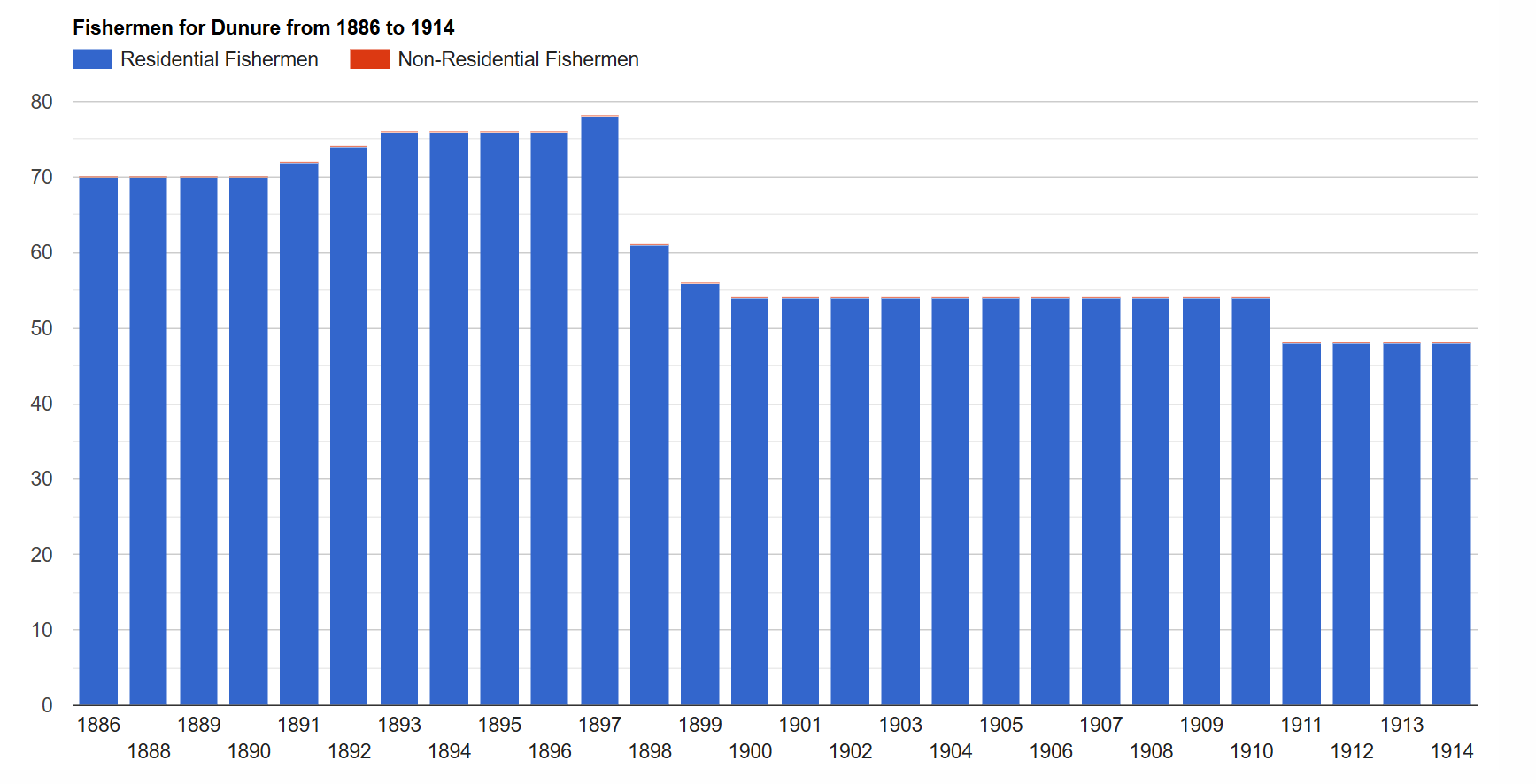
Fishermen

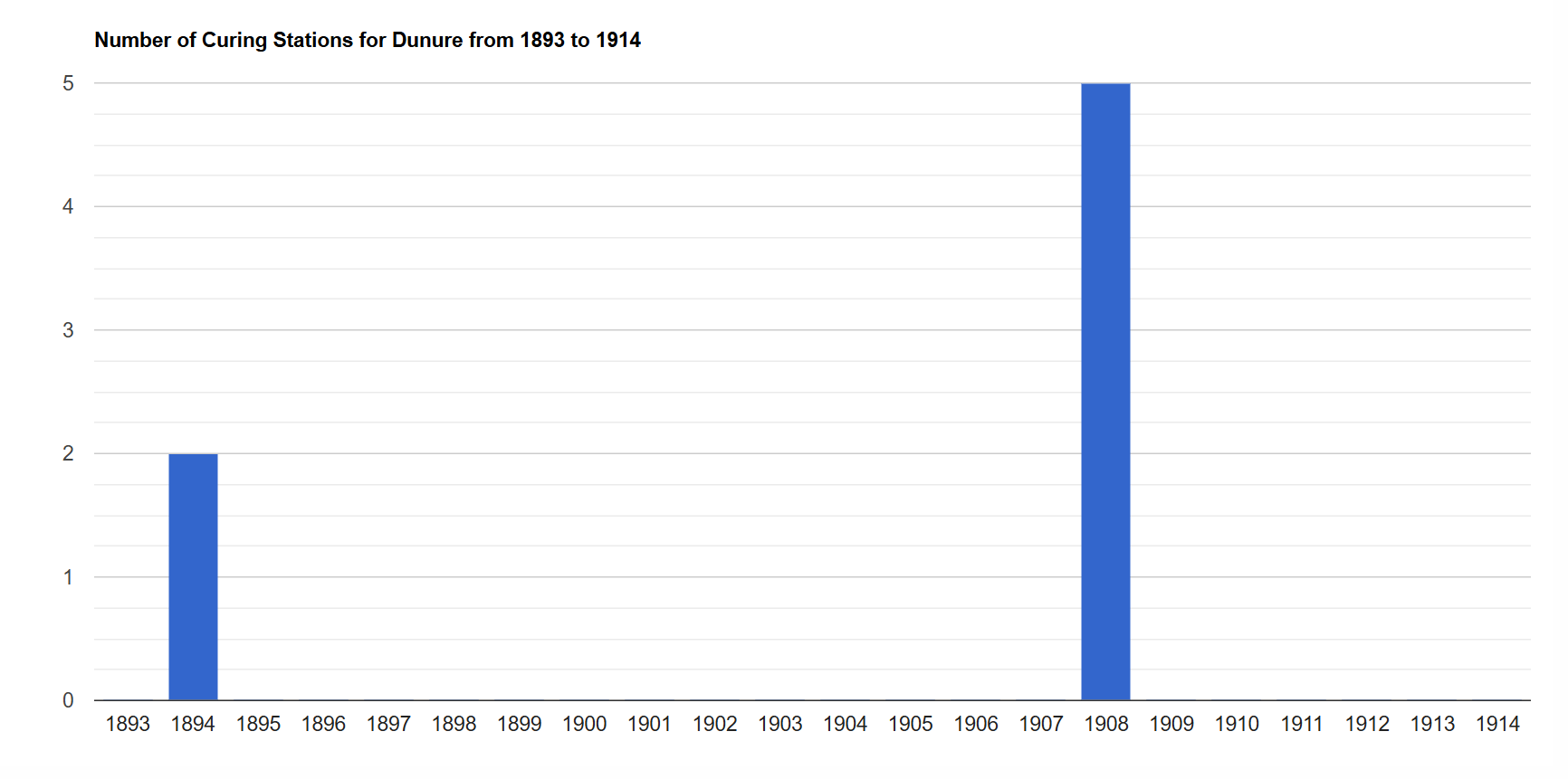
Placeholder- no curing stations

In 1912 an increase of the landings in Ayr was ascribed to crews from Dunure and Maidens. There was a corresponding drop in the landings at the latter two ports.

=== Transport ===
There was previously a Dunure railway station in the village on the Maidens and Dunure Railway: the station closed in the 1930s.

Operated by Stagecoach West Scotland, the 361 bus service to Ayr & Straiton starts/terminates here.
