= Dunure railway station =

Former railway station in Scotland

Dunure
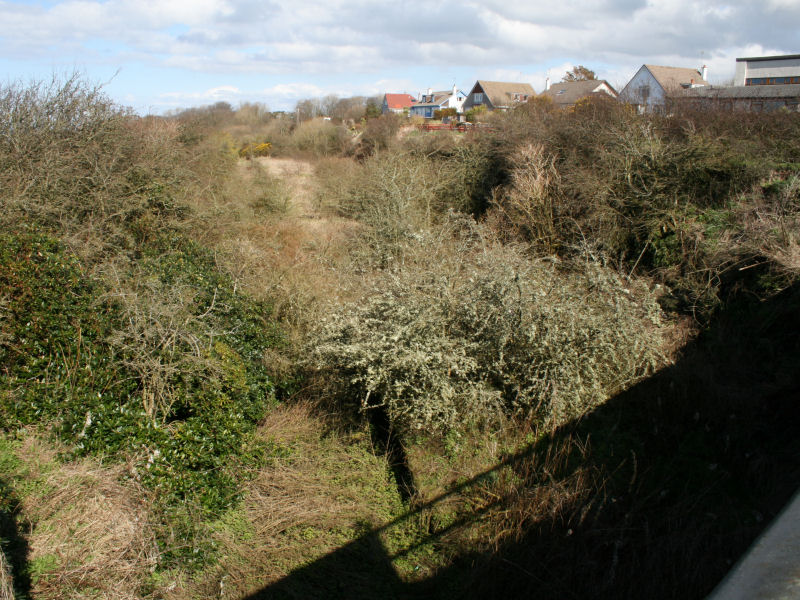
- The overgrown remains of Dunure in 2008.

General information
- Location: Dunure, Ayrshire; Scotland
- Coordinates: 55.4134°N 4.7454°W
- Grid reference: NS263167
- Platforms: 2

Other information
- Status: Disused

History
- Original company: Maidens and Dunure Light Railway
- Pre-grouping: Glasgow and South Western Railway
- Post-grouping: London, Midland and Scottish Railway

Key dates
- 17 May 1906: Opened
- 1 December 1930: Closed
- 4 July 1932: Reopened
- 1 June 1933: Closed
Location

Dunure railway station was a railway station serving the village of Dunure, South Ayrshire, Scotland. The station was part of the Maidens and Dunure Light Railway.

== History ==
The station opened on 17 May 1906. It closed on 1 December 1930, but reopened briefly between 4 July 1932 and 1 June 1933.

The station consisted of an island platform, accessed from the road bridge at the end of the platform. The overgrown island platform still exists today.

| Preceding station | Historical railways | Following station |
|---|---|---|
| Knoweside; Line and station closed | Glasgow and South Western Railway; Maidens and Dunure Light Railway | Heads of Ayr; Line and station closed |
