= Turnberry railway station =

Former railway station in Scotland

Coordinates: 55.3130°N 4.8273°W

Turnberry

General information
- Location: Turnberry Golf Course, Ayrshire; Scotland
- Grid reference: NS206057
- Platforms: 1

Other information
- Status: Disused

History
- Original company: Maidens and Dunure Light Railway
- Pre-grouping: Glasgow and South Western Railway

Key dates
- 17 May 1906: Opened
- 2 March 1942: Closed
Location

Turnberry railway station was a railway station serving the Turnberry Golf Course and its associated hotel, South Ayrshire, Scotland. The station was part of the Maidens and Dunure Light Railway.

== History ==
The station opened on 17 May 1906, and closed on 2 March 1942. The platform roof was sold to Dumbarton F.C. in 1957 and used as a terrace cover at the football club's former ground at Boghead Park. Its significance as a railway station can still be linked to the Turnberry Hotel and club house which displays an original railway poster by Claude Buckle showing the Turnberry Hotel in 1932.

Preceding station	Historical railways	Following station
Girvan; Line closed, station open	Glasgow and South Western Railway; Maidens and Dunure Light Railway	Maidens; Line and station closed
