= Boghead Park =

Former football ground in Dumbarton, Scotland

- Location within West Dunbartonshire
- Location: Dumbarton, Scotland
- Coordinates: 55°56′52.23″N 4°33′04.67″W
- Surface: Grass
- Record attendance: 18,001

Tenants
- Dumbarton (1879–2000); Clydebank (1996–1999)

Boghead Park was a football ground in the town of Dumbarton, Scotland. It was owned by Dumbarton F.C., who played there for 121 years between 1879 and 2000. By the time the ground closed in 2000, it was the oldest stadium in Scotland that had been in continuous use.

== History ==
Dumbarton first used Boghead Park in 1879. The club shared the first Scottish league championship in 1891 with Rangers, then became the first outright champions in 1892.

The pitch was turned 90 degrees in 1913. After this the club constructed a tiny main stand, nicknamed the "Postage Box", which only had a capacity of 80 seats. It was replaced by a modern facility that held 303 people in 1980. The new stand was opened by Alan Hardaker, former secretary of the English Football League. Next to this stand was a small cover used by bookmakers when Boghead staged greyhound racing.

Floodlights were installed in 1957 and the ground's record attendance was set in the same year, 18,001 for a Scottish Cup match against Raith Rovers, which Dumbarton lost 4–1. Also in 1957 the club bought the platform roof from Turnberry railway station for use as a terrace cover.

Having played host to a crowd of almost 20,000, Boghead Park was latterly a sad sight. In 1994, the club was ordered to construct a fence in front of toilets in the ground, because local residents complained that they could see inside the toilets. The ground fell into a level of disrepair and its capacity, which was around 10,000 when Dumbarton played in the Premier Division in the mid-1980s, was reduced to 5,000 by 1995, and less than 3,000 by the time of the ground's closure. This was largely due to the club not maintaining the site as they decided whether to renovate the ground or move on to pastures new.

That the board chose to let the ground get into a run down state is signified by the fact that when one of the two stands that existed at Boghead Park in the mid-1980s was destroyed by fire, they chose not to replace it, instead leaving the site empty. Ambitious plans were created for the redevelopment of Boghead Park into an all seated facility with a capacity in the region of 9,000. These plans are on show at the Scottish Football Museum at Hampden Park, but were never put into practice by the club. Dumbarton eventually sold Boghead Park site for a housing development and moved to a new stadium elsewhere in the town, the Dumbarton Football Stadium, in 2000.

== Greyhound racing ==
A greyhound track was erected around the pitch at Boghead Park in 1932 with the first meeting taking place on 7 October 1932. The track was independent (unlicensed) but the exact date of closure is unknown.

== Groundshares ==
Boghead Park was used by Greenock Morton for a single match on 1 January 1949; the game against St Mirren was moved from Morton's Cappielow Park as the pitch was unplayable.

After leaving New Kilbowie Park, Clydebank used Boghead Park as their home ground between 1996 and 1999, when they moved to Cappielow Park.

== In popular culture ==
Boghead Park was chosen by Robert Duvall as the supposed home ground of the fictional football team, Kilnockie F.C. for his film, "A Shot at Glory". Duvall allegedly chose Boghead Park because of its ramshackle nature, but ironically, the filming involved the film crew making improvements to the football ground.

The stadium is the subject of the song High Tension at Boghead, released by The Supernaturals as a B-side to their 1997 single Prepare To Land.

== See also ==
- Stadium relocations in Scottish football
