= Heads of Ayr Holiday Camp railway station =

Former railway station in Scotland

Heads of Ayr Holiday Camp

General information
- Location: Heads of Ayr, Ayrshire; Scotland
- Coordinates: 55.42811°N 4.6865°W
- Grid reference: NS301181
- Platforms: 1

Other information
- Status: Disused

History
- Original company: London, Midland and Scottish Railway

Key dates
- 17 May 1947: Opened
- 16 September 1968: Closed
Location

Heads of Ayr Holiday Camp railway station was a railway station serving the holiday camp and hotel at Heads of Ayr, South Ayrshire, Scotland. The station was opened by the London, Midland and Scottish Railway on the former Maidens and Dunure Light Railway.

== History ==
The station opened on 17 May 1947, shortly before nationalisation and the formation of British Railways. It closed on 16 September 1968, along with remaining section of the former Maidens and Dunure line between the station and Alloway Junction.

| Preceding station | Historical railways | Following station |
|---|---|---|
| Terminus | British Railways; Maidens and Dunure Light Railway | Ayr |
