= Richard Alexander Oswald =

Scottish politician (1771–1841)

Member of Parliament for Ayrshire
- In office 1832–1835
- Preceded by: William Blair
- Succeeded by: John Dunlop

Personal details
- Born: 17 February 1771
- Died: 19 June 1841 (aged 70)
- Party: Whig Party
- Spouse(s): Louisa "Lucy" Johnstone (m. 1793; died 1797) Lady Lilias MacQueen (m. 1817; died 1841)
- Parents: George Oswald (father); Margaret Smythe (mother)

Richard Alexander Oswald (17 February 1771 – 19 June 1841) was a Scottish Whig Party politician who sat in the House of Commons from 1832 to 1835.

== Early life ==
Oswald was the son of George Oswald, a merchant of Scotstoun, Rector of Glasgow University, and Margaret Smythe (1747–1791), daughter of David Smythe of Methven. He was also the grand nephew of Richard Oswald of Auchincruive. Among his siblings were Maj. David Oswald of the 38th Regiment (who died in the West Indies), Capt. James Oswald of the Royal Navy, Alexander Oswald (who married Anne Dalrymple, youngest daughter of Sir Hew Dalrymple Hamilton of Bargany House), Catherine Oswald (who married Robert Haldane), Margaret Oswald (who married Maj.-Gen. John Wilson), and Mary Ramsay (who married James Dennistoun).

== Career ==
At the 1832 general election Oswald was elected as the Member of Parliament (MP) for Ayrshire. He held the seat until 1835.

== Personal life ==
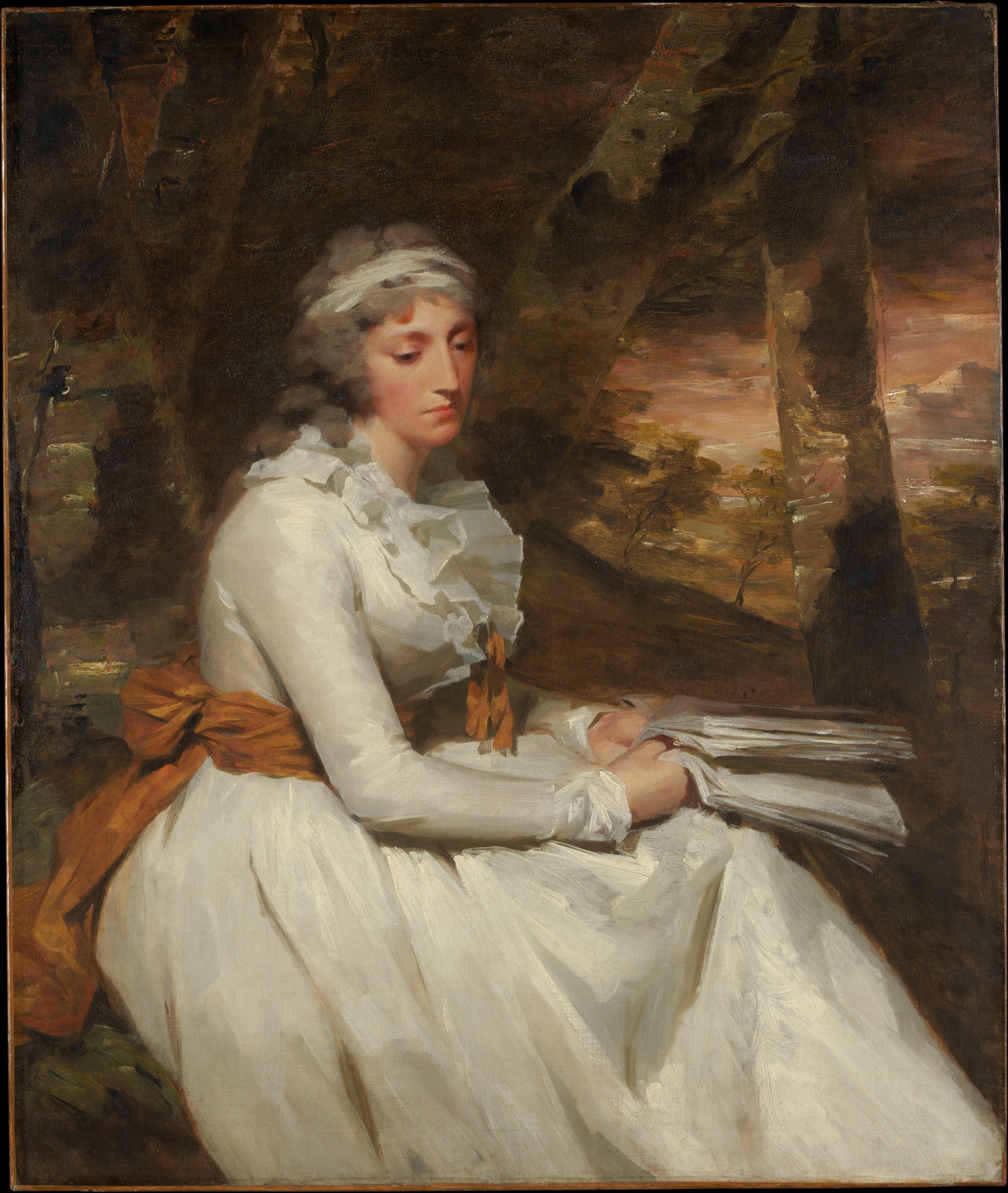
Louisa Johnston, portrait by Sir Henry Raeburn

Oswald married twice. On 23 April 1793 in Edinburgh Parish, he married Louisa "Lucy" Johnstone. The poet Robert Burns composed his verses, "O wat ye wha's in yon town?" to her. Before death of consumption at Lisbon in 1797, they were the parents of:

- Richard Oswald (d. 1833), who married Lady Mary Kennedy, a daughter of Archibald Kennedy, 1st Marquess of Ailsa and Margaret Erskine of Dun.
- Margaret Hester Oswald (d. 1855), whom married Thomas Spencer Lindsey of Hollymount, County Mayo, in 1818.

After the death of his first wife, Oswald married Lady Lilias (née Montgomerie) MacQueen (d. 1845) in 1817. Lady Lilias, a daughter of Hugh Montgomerie, 12th Earl of Eglinton, was the widow of Robert Dundas MacQueen of Braxfield.

Oswald died on 19 June 1841, at the age of 70. As his son Richard predeceased him, the family estates passed to a cousin, James Oswald, in 1841. Margaret, who was described in an obituary as "the only daughter of the late Richard Alexander Oswald, Esq. of Auchencruive," Oswald's will shows that a beneficiary was a granddaughter Margaret Nina Lindsey.

Parliament of the United Kingdom
Preceded by William Blair	Member of Parliament for Ayrshire; 1832 – 1835	Succeeded by John Dunlop
