= List of waggonways in Scotland =

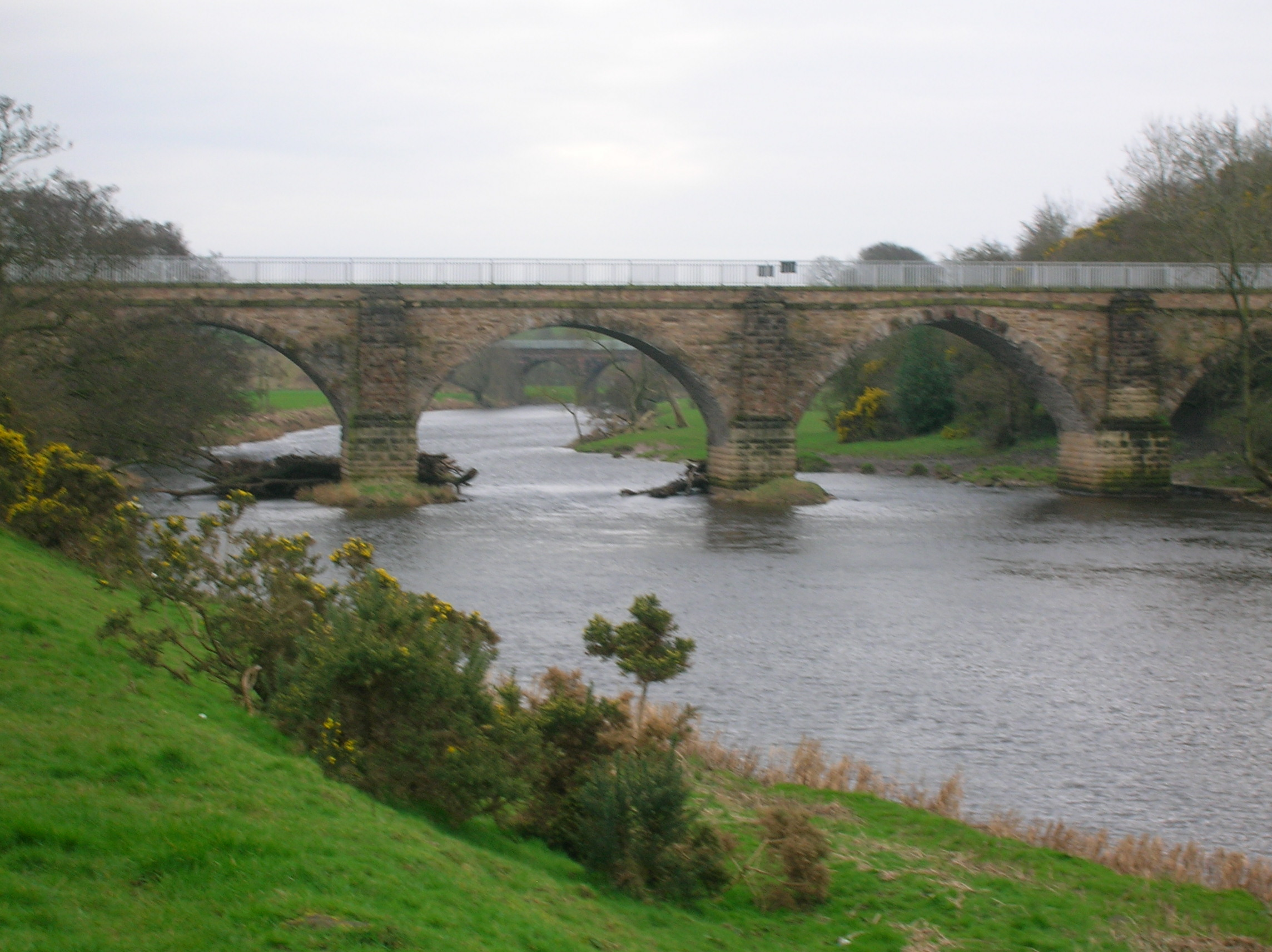
Laigh Milton Viaduct on the Kilmarnock and Troon Railway, opened in 1812

Numerous horse-drawn waggonways were constructed in Scotland during the Industrial Revolution, mainly in connection with the ironworks and coal mines ("pits") of the Central Belt.

The earliest railways, beginning with the Tranent to Cockenzie Waggonway in 1722, had wooden rails, and several lines had been built by the time the first cast iron rails were produced in 1767.

Many of the later waggonways were built to the Scotch gauge of 4 ft 6 in (1,372 mm), and were subsequently converted to standard-gauge steam railways.

Name	Opened	Route	Notes
Alloa Waggonway	1768	Collyland & Alloa Pits to Alloa glassworks	
Ardrossan and Johnstone Railway	1831	Kilwinning collieries to Ardrossan Harbour	Merged with the Glasgow and South Western Railway
Auchincruive Waggonway	c.1784	Newton-on-Ayr to Annbank	Abandoned
Bainsford waggonway	1810	Carron Works to the Forth & Clyde Canal at Burnhouse Basin	
Ballochney Railway	1828	Arden Colliery, Ballochney to Kipps (connection with Monkland and Kirkintilloch Railway)	Merged into Monkland Railways
Brora colliery tramway	1770	Brora colliery to Brora Salt Works, Sutherland	
Calderbank	c.1797	Calderbank Ironworks to Monkland Canal	
Carron Railway	c.1766	Kinnaird & Carronhall collieries to Carron Works	
Craigie Waggonway	c.1855	Craigie Pits to Ayr	Lifted after 1865
Drumpeller Railway	1847	Bankhead collieries to Monkland Canal at Cuilhill Gullet	
Dundee and Newtyle Railway	1831	Newtyle to Dundee	Taken over by the Dundee and Perth Railway
Edinburgh and Dalkeith Railway	1831	Dalkeith to Edinburgh (St Leonards) & Fisherrow Harbour, Musselburgh	Sold to the North British Railway
Edmonstone Railway (or Newton Railway)	1818	Newton Colliery to Little France, Edinburgh	
Elgin Wagonway	c.1773	Berrylaw pits (west of Dunfermline) to the coast at Limekilns and Charlestown, Fife	Developed as the Dunfermline and Charlestown Railway
Fairlie Mains	1818	Peatland coalworks to Kilmarnock and Troon Railway at Drybridge	
Fordell Railway	c.1752	Fordell Collieries to St Davids Harbour, Inverkeithing Bay	
Garnkirk and Glasgow Railway	1831	Gartsherrie (Monkland and Kirkintilloch Railway junction) to Garnkirk and Glasgow	Merged into Monkland Railways
Govan Railway	1775-78	Govan Colliery to Wherry Wharf, Windmillcroft Quay, Glasgow	Extended as Polloc and Govan Railway
Halbeath Railway	1783	Halbeath Colliery to Inverkeithing Harbour	
Hurlet Waggonway	1820	Hurlet Coal & Limeworks to Glasgow, Paisley & Ardrossan Canal at Rosshall quay, Paisley	
Irvine Colliery	c.1836	Irvine Colliery to Irvine Harbour	
Kilmarnock and Troon Railway	1812	Kilmarnock to Troon harbour	
Knightswood Waggonway	c.1750	Woodside Colliery, Knightswood to River Clyde at Yoker	
Legbrannock Waggonway	1800	Legbrannock collieries to eastern end of Monkland Canal at Calderbank	
Marquis of Lothian's waggonway	1832	Coal pits at Arniston Engine to Dalhousie (connection with Edinburgh and Dalkeith Railway )	Sold to North British Railway
Monkland and Kirkintilloch Railway	1826	Palacecraig & Kipps collieries to the Forth and Clyde Canal at Kirkintilloch, plus branches	
Newbigging Limeworks	c.1817	Newbigging Limestone Mine to Carron Harbour, Fife	
Newton-upon-Ayr	c.1775	Newton-upon-Ayr pits to Ayr harbour	
Newtyle and Coupar Angus Railway	1837	Newtyle (junction with Dundee and Newtyle Railway) to Coupar Angus	Taken over by the Scottish Midland Junction Railway
Newtyle and Glammis Railway	1838	Newtyle (junction with Dundee and Newtyle Railway) to Glamis	Taken over by the Scottish Midland Junction Railway
Omoa Waggonway	1813	Newarthill collieries to Omoa Ironworks, Cleland, North Lanarkshire	
Paisley and Renfrew Railway	1837	Paisley to Renfrew Wharf on the River Clyde	Sold to the Glasgow, Paisley, Kilmarnock and Ayr Railway in 1847
Pinkie Railway (Hopes Railway)	1815	Pinkie Hill pits to Musselburgh & Fisherrow Harbour	
Polloc and Govan Railway	1840	Rutherglen to Broomielaw Harbour, Glasgow	
Ravenscraig and Jameston Railway	?	Ravenscraig Quarry to Jameston Quarry, Dalry, North Ayrshire	
Sauchie	by 1806	Devonside & Tillicoultry pits & ironworks to Clackmannan Pow	
Shotts Iron Works	by 1813		
Stevenston Waggonway	by 1812	Stevenston Canal Basin at Saltcoats to the harbour	Closed by 1852
Townhill waggonway	1841	Townhill colliery to the Halbeath Railway at Guttergates	
Tranent to Cockenzie Waggonway	1722	Tranent coalpits to Cockenzie Salt Pans & Port Seton Harbour	Re-routed to Cockenzie Harbour in 1815
Venture Fair waggonway (Symes' Railway)	1812	Venture Fair Colliery to Dunfermline	
Wemyss waggonway	by 1795	Wemyss Coalpits to Methil Harbour	
Wilsontown	c.1805	Climpy colliery to Wilsontown Ironworks, South Lanarkshire	
Wishaw and Coltness Railway	1833	Chapel Colliery, Newmains to the Monkland and Kirkintilloch Railway near Whifflet	
