= Craigie Waggonway =

Former railway line in Scotland

Coordinates: 55.4632°N 4.6229°W

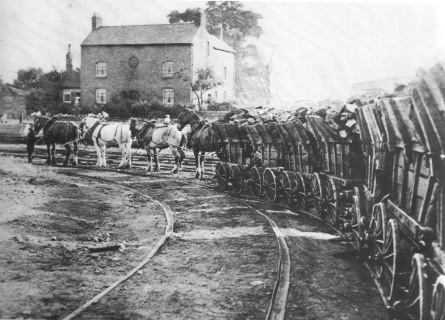
- The Little Eaton Waggonway in 1908

Overview
- Locale: Ayr and Craigie, South Ayrshire
- Dates of operation: 1855 circa–1865 circa
- Successor: Abandoned

Technical
- Track gauge: Unknown
- Length: 1.3 miles (2.1 km)

The Craigie Waggonway was a short lived mineral railway or 'Bogey line' of just over a mile in length that transported coal from five or more coal pits on the Craigie Estate to Ayr where it was either used locally or was taken to the harbour in carts for export, mainly to Ireland.

== History ==
The waggonway had a lot in common with the Towerlands Tram Road in Irvine that carried coal from local coal pits and delivered it to an area close to the historic town centre. In 1855 Robert Brown is recorded as the owner of the first Craigie Pit and by 1857 Nos. 2 & 3 were operating. Although once owned by the Wallace family who had been involved in coal mining the estate had passed to James Campbell by 1855. The surrounding estates of Newton-on-Ayr, Wallacetwon, Blackhouse, Auchincruive and Holmston were all also involved in coal mining and related activities.

== The pits ==
Craigie Pits Nos 1, 2, 3, 4 and 6 lay on the route of the waggonway and the OS maps shows three of them linked to the 'main line' by single or double track branches. The pits lay on or in the vicinity of the Ayr Racecourse. In 1861 six coal pits were in operation on the Craigie Estates with five at least served by the waggonway.

== Associated infrastructure ==
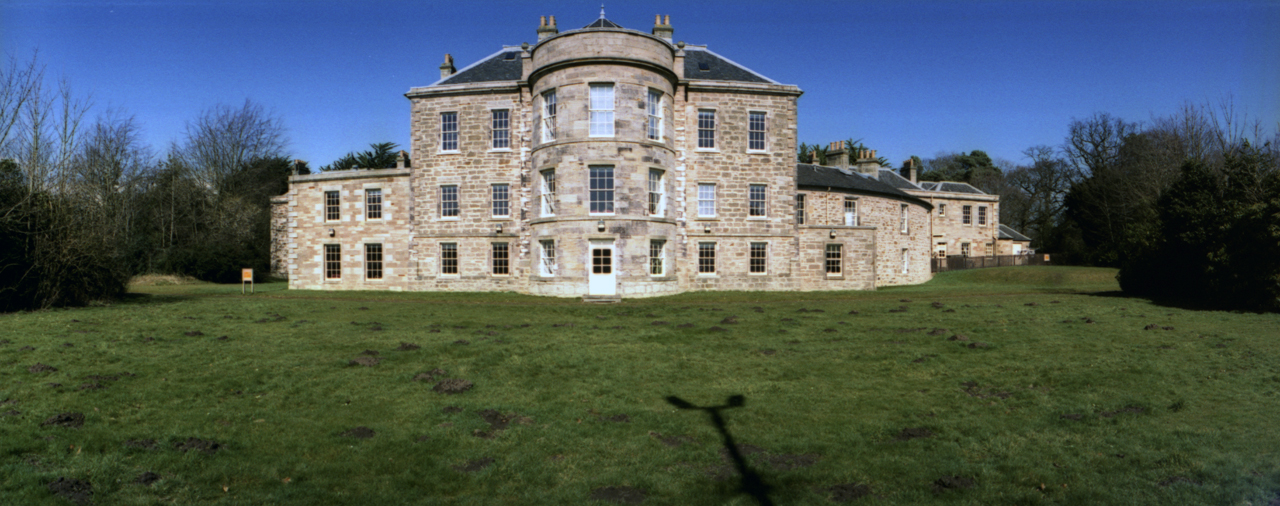
Craigie Mansion House, Ayr.

It is known that various sorts of sleepers were in use at the time on waggonways or tram roads, however on the nearby and contemporary Auchincruive Waggonway wood and also stone blocks have been found, square or oblong stone blocks being favoured on many horse-worked lines as they did not interfere with the centre of the track. The waggonway gauge is not known. The 'main line' was single track without passing loops. No indication of formal signalling is recorded and it is not clear what sort of rails and chairs were used.

== Operation of the waggonway ==
In keeping with other such waggonways the line was probably worked by horses with some manual handling. The waggonway did not reach the quayside however and coal may have been delivered to the town from here and a short distance away at the Ayr north quay stood the wooden and later steel 'hurries' where coal was tipped into the holds of the fleet of colliers and most transported to Ireland. In 1857 four hurries are shown on the OS map, connected to the Auchincruive or Whitletts Waggonway. A horse could haul between 5 and 7 coal waggons carrying 26 cwt each.

The Craigie Waggonway reached as far as the rear of buildings that faced on to Content Street (named after a local farm) and on the OS map of 1857 a smithy is marked, possibly also indicating stables as both would be required for a horse draw line.

== The routes ==
Location of the Craigie Waggonway, South Ayrshire

The line started at Craigie Pit No.1 that also had a road connection with the Braehead to Mainholm Road close to Dalmilling and then curved down past Craigie Pits Nos 2 and 3 before passing one of the Craigie House lodges and crossing the railway before terminating at Content Street. The route was nearly level and was not unduly encumbered by drifting sand from the dunes that lay further west.

== The waggonway and pits today ==
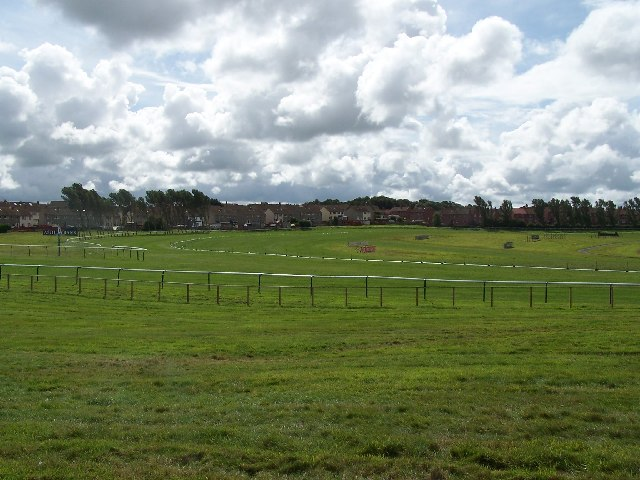
Ayr Racecourse, the site of the waggonway with associated coal pits. Looking towards the wooded policies of Craigie House.

Described as a 'Tram Road' on the OS maps the line was mostly on the level and no earthworks of any significance were required. Nothing survives at many of the various pits and associated spoil heaps, however a bridge crossed the Glasgow and South Western Railway line into Ayr close to the waggonway termination at Content Street and the remnants of this can be discerned.

== Micro-history ==
Other contemporary waggonways existed locally such as the Auchincruive Waggonway and the nearby Holmiston Waggonway with sections of trackbed traceable on the south side of the River Ayr near the Holmston lime kiln above Wallace's Heel Well. A very short waggonway appears to have existed at Wallacetown as far back as 1775.

A short tramway existed at the nearby Ayr Sawmills that lay next to the River Ayr.

The poet Robert Burns would have been familiar with the waggonways in Ayr however he never commented on them.

== See also ==
- Haytor Granite Tramway
- Ravenscraig and Jameston Railway
- Stevenston Canal
- Auchincruive Waggonway
