= Governor Montgomerie =

Governor Montgomerie may refer to:

- James Montgomerie (1755–1829), Acting Governor of Demerara from 1805 to 1808 and Governor of Dominica in 1808
- John Montgomerie (died 1731), Colonial Governor of New York and New Jersey from 1728 to 1731
