= James Montgomerie =

Scottish soldier and politician

Lieutenant-General James Montgomerie
- Born: 6 February 1755
- Died: 13 April 1829 (aged 74); Bath, Somerset
- Military career
- Allegiance: United Kingdom
- Branch: (United Kingdom) British Army
- Service years: 1773 to 1829
- Rank: British Army Lieutenant-General
- Other work: M.P. for Ayrshire

Lieutenant-General James Montgomerie (26 February 1755 – 13 April 1829) was a Scottish soldier and politician who sat in Parliament for Ayrshire 1818–29.

== Family ==
James Montgomerie was the fourth son of Alexander Montgomerie of Coilsfield (near Tarbolton) and Lillias Montgomerie, making him the youngest brother of Hugh Montgomerie, 12th Earl of Eglinton.

== Military career ==
Appointed ensign in the 51st Foot in 1773, he joined the regiment at Minorca in 1774. The following year he transferred to the 19th Foot as adjutant, being promoted lieutenant in 1779. In 1780 he was promoted captain of a company in the 93rd Foot and sailed to the West Indies. His regiment returned to England soon after arrival, but Montgomerie remained in Jamaica as a staff officer until 1781.

In 1783 he was one of the officers put on half pay as a captain in the 10th Foot, returning to active service with this regiment in Jamaica in 1786. From 1790 to 1793 he was in England on recruitment, and in 1794 was appointed an officer of the Home Staff with the rank of major.

In May 1795 he was appointed lieutenant-colonel of the 6th West India Regiment, sailing to Martinique. From 1796 to 1798 he was civil and military commander of Saint Kitts, with the 31st Light Dragoons. In 1798 he transferred to the 45th Foot in Dominica, but returned to England due to ill health. He was promoted colonel by brevet in 1802 and lieutenant-colonel of the 64th Foot in 1804, the same year being appointed to hold civil and military command at Tobago. From much of the period from 1805 to 1808 he was acting governor of Demerara. In 1808 he returned to Dominica as governor, and in 1809 to England, where he received the rank of major-general.

In 1813 he was appointed colonel of the 74th Foot, promoted to lieutenant-general in 1814. In 1823 he was appointed colonel of the 30th Foot, retaining that command until his death.

== Parliamentary career ==
Montgomerie was elected to parliament as M.P. for Ayrshire in the general election of 1818, and was re-elected in 1820 and 1826.

He spoke in Parliament on the issue of Sheriffs Depute in Scotland, on 29 March 1822.

He died at Bath, Somerset in May 1829.

Parliament of Great Britain
Preceded by Sir Hew Dalrymple-Hamilton	Member of Parliament for Ayrshire; 1818–1829	Succeeded by William Blair
Military offices
Preceded by Robert Manners	Colonel of the 30th (Cambridgeshire) Regiment of Foot; 1823–1829	Succeeded by Sir Thomas Bradford
Preceded by Sir Alexander Hope	Colonel of the 74th Regiment of Foot; 1813–1823	Succeeded by Sir Charles Colville
