= George Oswald =

Scottish merchant

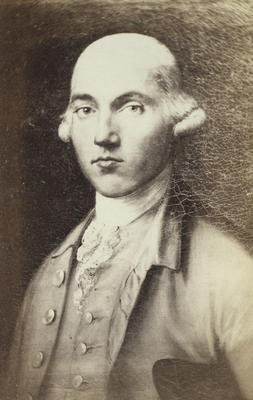
George Oswald, photograph by Thomas Annan of portrait by Thomas Gainsborough

George Oswald of Scotstoun (1735–1819) was a Scottish merchant of Glasgow. In 1797 he was elected Rector of the University of Glasgow.

== Life ==
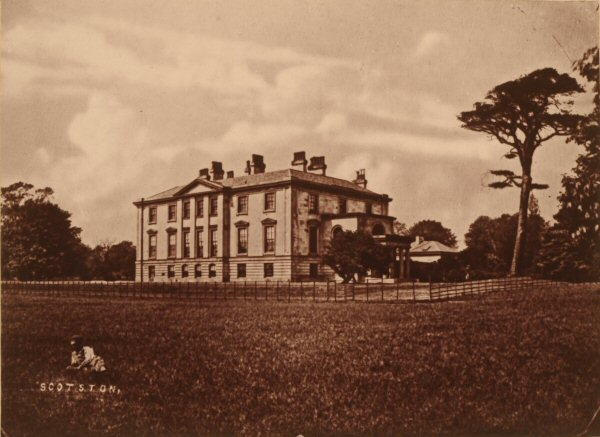
Scotstoun House

He was the son of the Rev. James Oswald (1703–1793), and nephew of the merchant Richard Oswald (1705?–1784). Initially he worked in the Glasgow firm run by his father's cousins the brothers Richard Oswald (1687–1763) of Scotstoun and Alexander Oswald (1694–1766). They left him the Scotstoun and Balshagray estates, both having died by 1766. He lived at Scotstoun House and adopted the overall name of "George Oswald of Scotstoun".

Oswald became head of the tobacco firm of Oswald, Dennistoun, & Co. of Glasgow, and partner in the Ship Bank there. He was left the Auchincruive estate on the 1784 death of Richard Oswald his uncle, coming into possession of it on the death of his aunt in 1788.

Oswald died on 6 October 1819, aged 84.

== Family ==
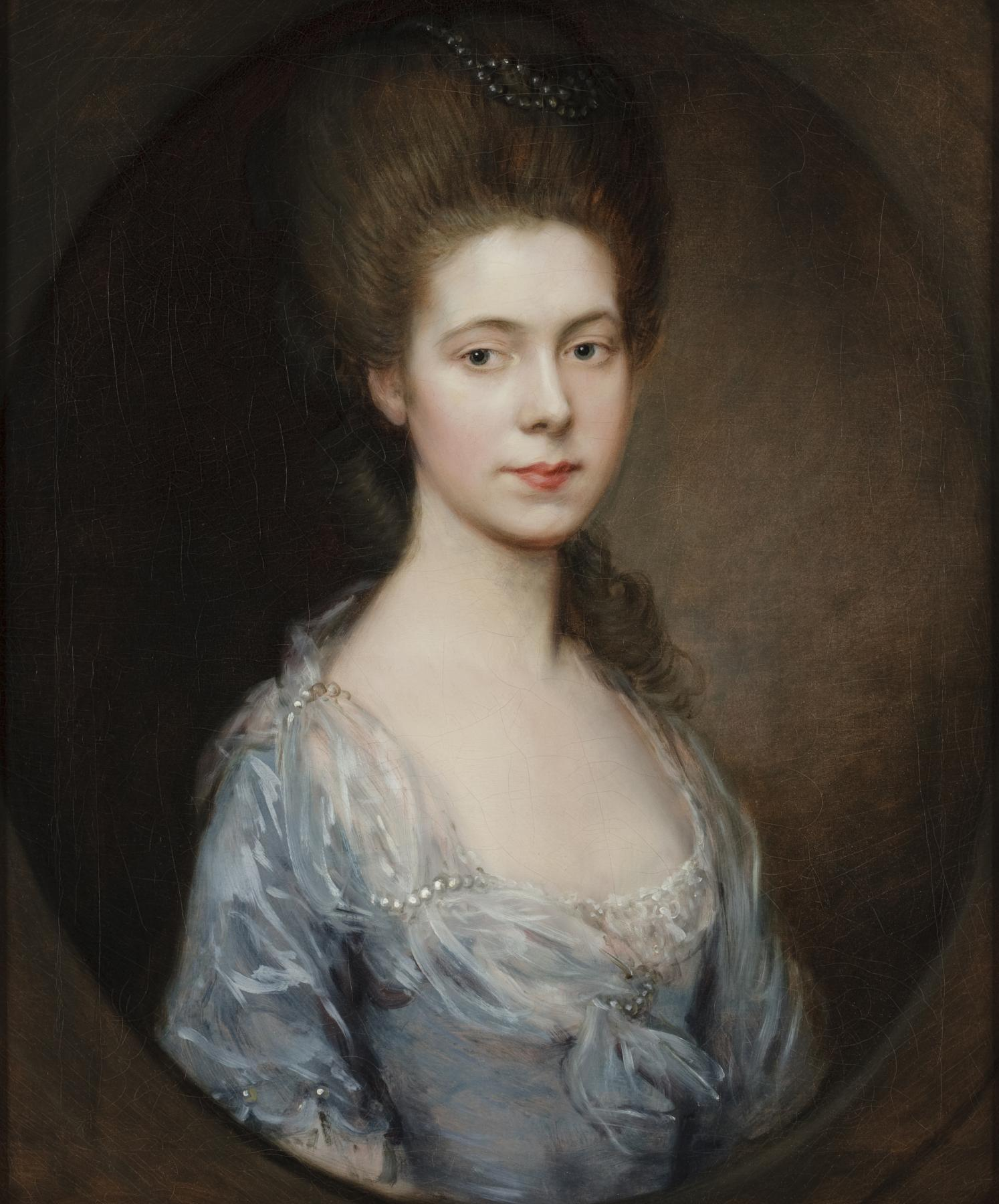
Margaret Oswald, portrait by Thomas Gainsborough

In 1764 Oswald married Margaret Smythe (1747–1791), daughter of David Smythe of Methven. They had four sons and at least five daughters.

The children included:

- Richard Alexander Oswald
- David (died 1797 in the West Indies), major of the 38th Regiment
- James, third son (died 1822), a naval captain
- Alexander Oswald (01 Apr 1777–12 Jul 1821), Advocate, married Miss Anne Dalrymple (who died 22 Jun 1820), youngest daughter of Sir Hew Dalrymple Hamilton of Bargany House
- Elizabeth
- Catherine or Katherine Cochrane, second daughter, married Robert Haldane
- Margaret, married Major General John Wilson
- Christian, married to the merchant Alexander Anderson
- Mary Ramsay, married James Dennistoun
- Camilla, died 1808
- Isabella.

== Notes ==
Attribution

This article incorporates text from a publication now in the public domain: Lee, Sidney, ed. (1895). "Oswald, Richard". Dictionary of National Biography. Vol. 42. London: Smith, Elder & Co.
