= Andrew Geddes (artist) =

Scottish artist (1783–1844)

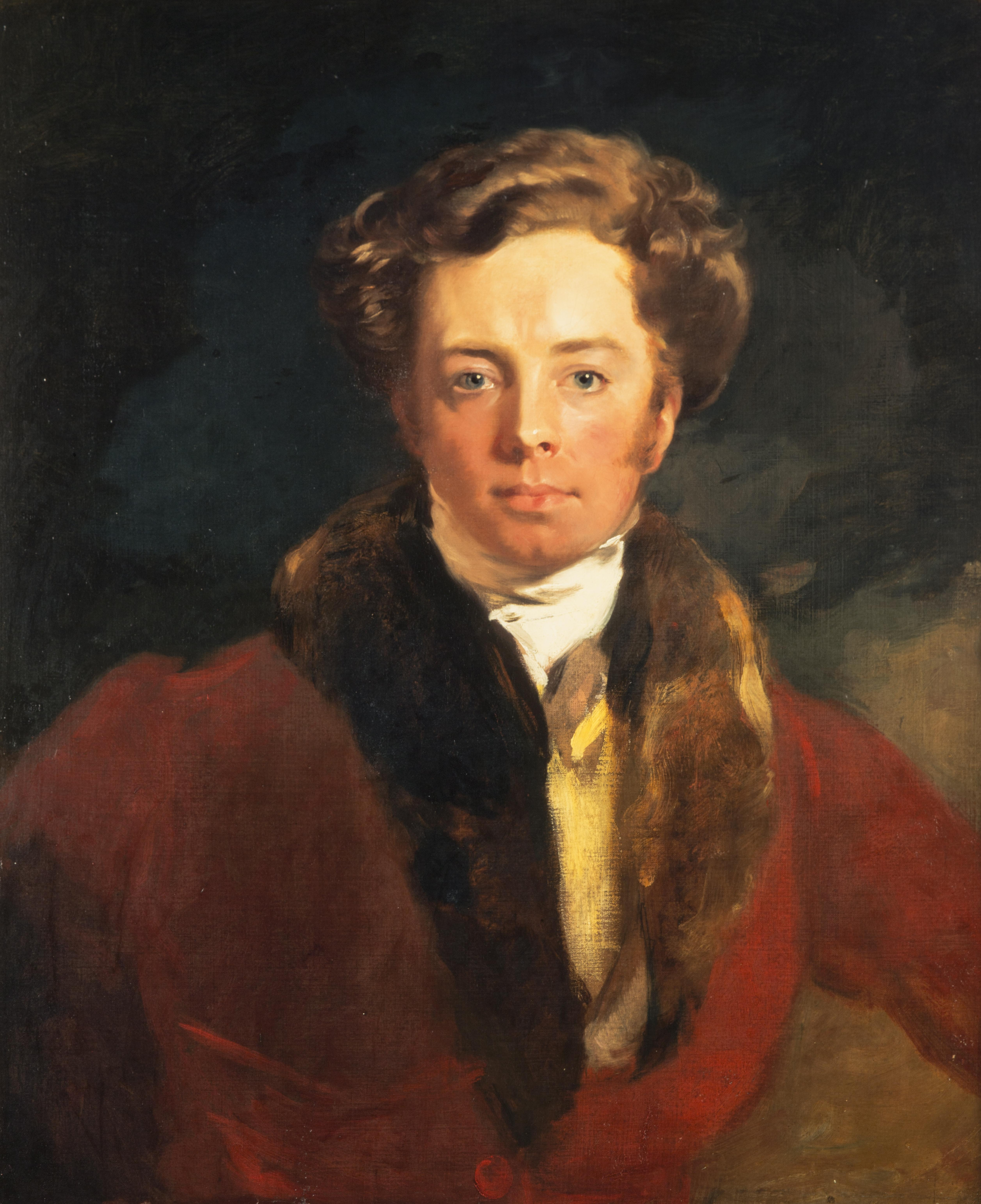
Self portrait (c. 1815)

Andrew Geddes ARA (5 April 1783 – 5 May 1844) was a Scottish portrait painter and etcher.

== Life ==
Geddes was born at 7 St Patrick Street in south Edinburgh.

After receiving a classical education at the Royal High School and subsequently at the University of Edinburgh, he was employed as a clerk for five years in the excise office, in which his father held the post of deputy auditor.

After the death of his father, who had opposed his desire to become an artist, he went to London and entered the Royal Academy schools. His first contribution to the exhibitions of the Royal Academy, a St John in the Wilderness, appeared at Somerset House in 1806, and from that year onwards Geddes was a fairly constant exhibitor of figure-subjects and portraits. His well-known portrait of David Wilkie, with whom he was on terms of intimacy, was at the Royal Academy in 1816. He alternated for some years between London and Edinburgh, with some excursions on the Continent, and in 1809 resided at 7 St James Square in Edinburgh, moving to 55 York Place in 1812.

In 1831 settled in London, and was elected associate of the Royal Academy in 1832.

He died at Berners Street in London of tuberculosis on 5 May 1844.

== Work ==
Geddes made his chief success as a portrait painter, but he produced occasional figure subjects and landscapes, and executed some copies of the old masters as well. He was also a good etcher. His portrait of his mother, and a portrait study, called Summer, are in the National Gallery of Scotland, and his portrait of Sir Walter Scott is in the Scottish National Portrait Gallery.

His portrait of Alexander Oswald of Changue FRSE is held at the Glasgow Museum Resource Centre.
