= James Dennistoun =

Scottish advocate, antiquary and art collector

James Dennistoun of Dennistoun (1803 – 13 February 1855) was a Scottish advocate, antiquary and art collector.

== Life ==
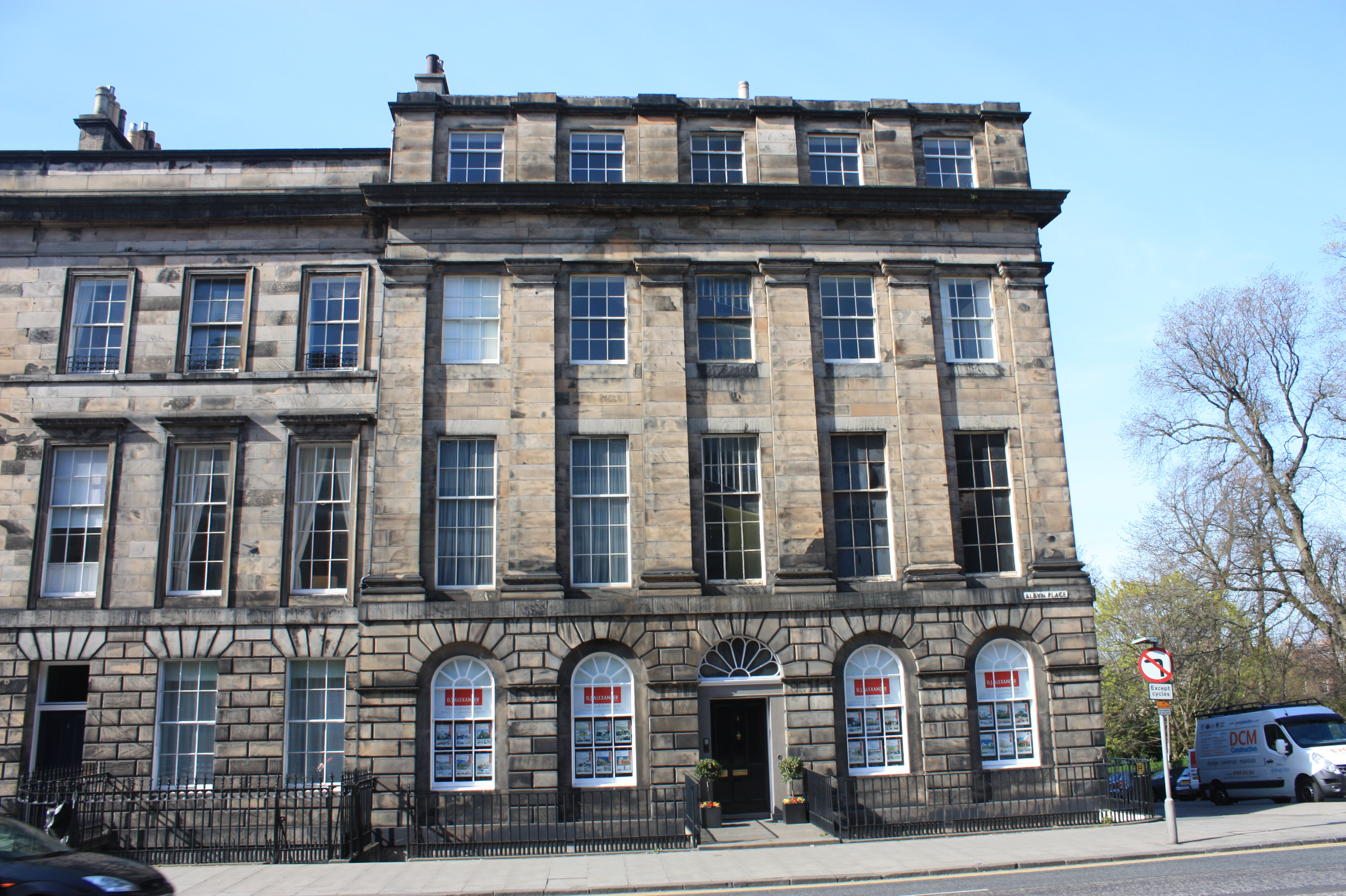
1 Albyn Place, Edinburgh, Dennistoun's Edinburgh home

Dennistoun was born in Dunbartonshire in 1803, the eldest son of Mary Ramsay, daughter of George Oswald of Auchencruive and James Dennistoun (died 1 June 1834). After receiving his education at the universities of Edinburgh and Glasgow, he became a member of the Faculty of Advocates in 1824.

During a continental tour in 1825 and 1826, in which his companions were Mark Napier, Hamilton Gray, and Sir Charles Fergusson, the art and literature of Italy first engaged Dennistoun's attention. After his father's death he sold the family estate on the shores of the River Clyde and purchased the farm of Dennistoun in Renfrewshire, the centre of the original possessions of his family in that county.

In 1833 "James Dennistoun, advocate" is listed as living at 1 Albyn Place, a huge house at the north-east of Edinburgh's First New Town on the edge of the Moray Estate.

In 1836 he again went abroad, and spent 12 years away from home, chiefly devoting himself to literary research and art. The winter generally found him in Rome, while the summers were given to journeys in Italy and Germany. He formed a collection of early Italian pictures, drawings, and mediæval antiquities, with which he adorned his house in George Street, Edinburgh, his permanent home from 1847.

He was a magistrate and deputy-lieutenant for the county of Renfrew, and became a member of most of the societies formed for collecting materials for illustrating the history of Scotland.

In 1835 he married in Isabella Katharina, eldest daughter of the Honorable James Wolfe Murray, Lord Cringletie.

He died at 119 George Street, Edinburgh on 13 February 1855, aged 52. Most of Dennistoun's collection of pictures, drawings, and antiquities was sold at Christie & Manson's on 14 June 1855.

== Works ==
For the Bannatyne Club Dennistoun edited Memoirs of the Affairs of Scotland from 1577 to 1603, by David Moysie, 1830. For the Maitland Club, Cartularium comitatus de Levenax, ab initio seculi decimi tertii usque ad annum MCCCXCVIII., 1833; the Cochrane Correspondence regarding the Affairs of Glasgow 1745–6, 1836; the Coltness Collections 1608–1840, 1842, and, as co-editor with Alexander Macdonald, Miscellany, consisting of Original Papers illustrative of the History and Literature of Scotland, vols. i. ii. and iii., 1834, &c.

Dennistoun also wrote a Letter on the Scotish [sic] Reform Bill by a Conservative, 1832; Memoirs of Sir Robert Strange, engraver, and of his brother-in-law, Andrew Lumisden, private secretary to the Stuart Princes, 1855, 2 vols. and Memoirs of the Dukes of Urbino, illustrating the Arms, Arts, and Literature of Italy from 1440 to 1630, 3 vols. 1851. To the Quarterly Review, December 1846, pp. 141–67, he furnished an article on The Stuarts in Italy, and to the Edinburgh Review, October 1854, pp. 461–490, a review of John Hill Burton's History of Scotland.

He gave evidence before the committee of the House of Commons on the National Gallery in 1853, and sent an analysis of the report of the committee to the Edinburgh Review, April 1854.
