= William Blair (Ayrshire MP) =

Scottish landowner and Tory politician

Member of Parliament for Ayrshire
- In office 13 May 1829 – 27 December 1832
- Monarchs: George IV and William IV
- Preceded by: James Montgomerie
- Succeeded by: Richard Alexander Oswald

Personal details
- Died: 21 October 1841
- Spouse: Magdalen Fordyce
- Children: 12, including William Fordyce Blair
- Parent(s): Hamilton Blair, Jane Williams

Military service
- Branch/service: Ayrshire Regiment, Fencible Cavalry
- Rank: Colonel

William Blair (died 21 October 1841) was a Scottish landowner and Tory politician. He was the Laird of Blair in Ayrshire in Scotland from 1782 to 1841. He was also the Member of Parliament (MP) for the Ayrshire constituency from 1829 to 32.

== Background ==
William Blair was the only son of Jane Williams and Major Hamilton Blair, the preceding laird of the barony of Blair in Ayrshire. Hamilton Blair succeeded his elder half brother from his father's first marriage, William Blair. Their father, William Scott, an advocate from Malleny near Edinburgh, had first married the Blair heiress Magadalene Blair, who died around 1715. Scot subsequently adopted the name Blair. The Blair family had been prominent for over 600 years in Ayrshire. The seat of the Blair barony, Blair House, is located about a mile and a half south-east of the township of Dalry.

== Political career ==
At the Ayrshire county meeting in April 1821, Blair seconded a petition opposing any change to the Scottish jury system.

In autumn 1828, Blair and Sir James Fergusson canvassed local freeholders, both professed "friendly dispositions" towards the Duke of Wellington's government. When Montgomerie died in April 1829, triggering a by-election, Fergusson did not stand, resulting in Blair claiming the election outright. While emphasising that he was not a member of a party, Blair stated that he supported "Tory principles" and the ministry considered him a supporter.

On the 22 November 1830, the Whig politician Earl Grey became prime minister in a landslide election, at which he had committed to introduce an electoral reform bill. Blair opposed the second reading of the Grey government's electoral Reform Act in March 1831, which aimed to increase the number of voters in electorates throughout the United Kingdom. Blair's opposition to the Reform Act prompted Richard Oswald to run against him in the next election. On 6 May 1831 a march was held in Kilmarnock in support of Oswald and the Reform Act, comprising some 5,000-,6000 people, including representatives from many classes of tradesmen. However, at the general election held on 18 May 1831, Blair defeated his pro-electoral reform opponent, Richard Oswald, 73 votes to 36, out of a possible 211 enrolled freeholders. This win prompted outbursts in the courthouse where the votes were counted, and it was surrounded outside, with Blair unable to leave for three hours until dragoons arrived to disperse the crowd. Blair was then escorted to the quay to board a ship, but when the troops left, the deck was pelted with stones, injuring those on board, including Blair who received a severe cut to the back of the head. In town, the windows of Blair's supporters were smashed. After re-election in 1831, Blair continued to vote against the readings of the Reform Act.

The English and Welsh Reform Act was passed into law on 7 June 1832, with the Scottish Reform Act passing at approximately the same time. The effect was considerable, in Ayrshire the number of voters increased from 211 to 3,197.

At the general election in 1832, Oswald stood again against Blair, who was heavily defeated and left office on 27 December.

Blair made no recorded remarks in parliamentary debates, he did however present several petitions to parliament on behalf, including one against the renewal of the East India Company's charter and an anti-slavery petition.

== Family ==
Blair married Magdalen Fordyce, daughter of John Fordyce, at St James's Church, Piccadilly in April 1789. They had 12 children:

1. Catherine Eglinton Blair, 1790–1847
2. Madaline Blair, 1791–1867
3. Hamilton Blair, 1793–1816
4. Louise Jean Blair, 1795–1817, married Col. William Jackson, son of George Jackson of Enniscoe
5. Elizabeth Agnes Blair, 1797-1861
6. John Charles Blair, 1798–1836
7. Charlotte Ann Blair, 1801–
8. Jane Gordon Blair, 1803–29
9. William Fordyce Blair, J.P., D.L., Capt. R.N., 1805–88, successor. He was the father of novelist Caroline Madelina Fairlie-Cuninghame.
10. Georgina Eglantine Blair, 1807–85
11. Henry Melville Blair, 1809–37
12. Augustus Thomas Blair, 1810–57

Blair died in Edinburgh in October 1841, leaving the Blair estate to his eldest surviving son, William Fordyce Blair, a naval captain.

Parliament of Great Britain
Preceded by James Montgomerie	Member of Parliament for Ayrshire; 1829–32	Succeeded by Richard Alexander Oswald
