= Caroline Madelina Fairlie-Cuninghame =

- Born: 1843; Scotland
- Died: November 27, 1902; Marseille
- Occupation: Novelist
- Spouse(s): Sir Charles Arthur Fairlie-Cuninghame of Robertland, 11th Bt.
- Children: 3

Caroline Madelina, Lady Fairlie-Cuninghame (1843 – November 27, 1902) was a Scottish novelist.

She was born Caroline Madelina Blair in 1843 in Scotland, the daughter of Royal Navy Captain William Fordyce Blair, son of William Blair, MP for Ayrshire, and Caroline Isabella Sprot. In 1867, she married Charles Arthur Cuningham-Fairlie, the future 11th Baronet of Fairlie-Cuninghame. They had three daughters and lived in Ryde on the Isle of Wight.

Caroline Fairlie-Cuninghame began publishing novels in the 1890s. In her The Slave of his Will (1891), Iris Winton comes under the psychic control of Ivan Zellanoff, to the point where she's forced to poison her husband Jack. In A Wandering Star (1892), Vega is the daughter of a man who lost his fortune gambling and after she is forced to marry an elderly alcoholic elopes with her lover. A Sin of the Soul (1895) features a man who mistreats his wife and is thrown off a boat to his death by his mother-in-law.

Caroline Madelina Fairlie-Cuninghame died on 27 November 1902 in Marseilles on her way back from a trip to India.

== Bibliography ==
- In Halcyon Seas: A Yachting Story. 1 vol. London: Simpkin, 1890.
- The Slave of his Will: A Novel. 1 vol. London: Spencer Blackett, 1891.
- A Wandering Star. 3 vol. London: Ward and Downey, 1892.
- A Sin of the Soul. 1 vol. London: Horace Cox, 1895.
- The Little Saint of God: A Heroine of the Red Terror. 1 vol. London: Hurst and Blackett, 1901.
