= John Wilson (British Army officer, died 1819) =

British Army officer

Major-General John Wilson
- Born: c.1764 Northumberland
- Died: 18 January 1819 (aged 54–55); London
- Military career
- Allegiance: United Kingdom
- Branch: British Army
- Service years: 1782–1818
- Rank: Major-general
- Commands: General Officer Commanding, Ceylon; Lieutenant-Governor of Lower Canada
- Conflicts: French Revolutionary Wars; West Indies campaign; Napoleonic Wars

John Wilson (c.1764 – 18 January 1819) was acting Lieutenant Governor of Lower Canada in 1816.

== Life ==
A career army officer initially in the West Indies, Wilson was ensign in the 48th Foot in 1782. He was captain in the 55th Foot in 1794, and lieutenant-colonel in the 8th West India Regiment in 1798. He served in the 21st Regiment in 1804, and was in the 5th garrison battalion in 1805.

In 1815 Wilson was selected to govern Canada in place of George Prevost.

With rank Major-General, Wilson administered Lower Canada from 21 May to 21 July 1816. He arrived late to relieve his predecessor, Gordon Drummond had taken over, and the two quarrelled.

Wilson returned to the United Kingdom from Canada and suffered about 18 months bad health, dying on 18 January 1819, at age 54. His will was granted probate on 1 March 1819, describing him as of Hatheridge, Northumberland.

== Family ==
Wilson married Margaret Oswald, daughter of George Oswald.

== Notes ==
Preceded by Sir Gordon Drummond	Governor General of British North America; 1816	Succeeded by Sir John Coape Sherbrooke
