= 31st Light Dragoons =

Cavalry regiment of the British Army

The 31st Light Dragoons was a cavalry regiment of the British Army. It was raised in 1794, by Colonel William St Leger and disbanded on 26 February 1796.
