= Richard Oswald (merchant) =

Scottish merchant, slave trader, and diplomat

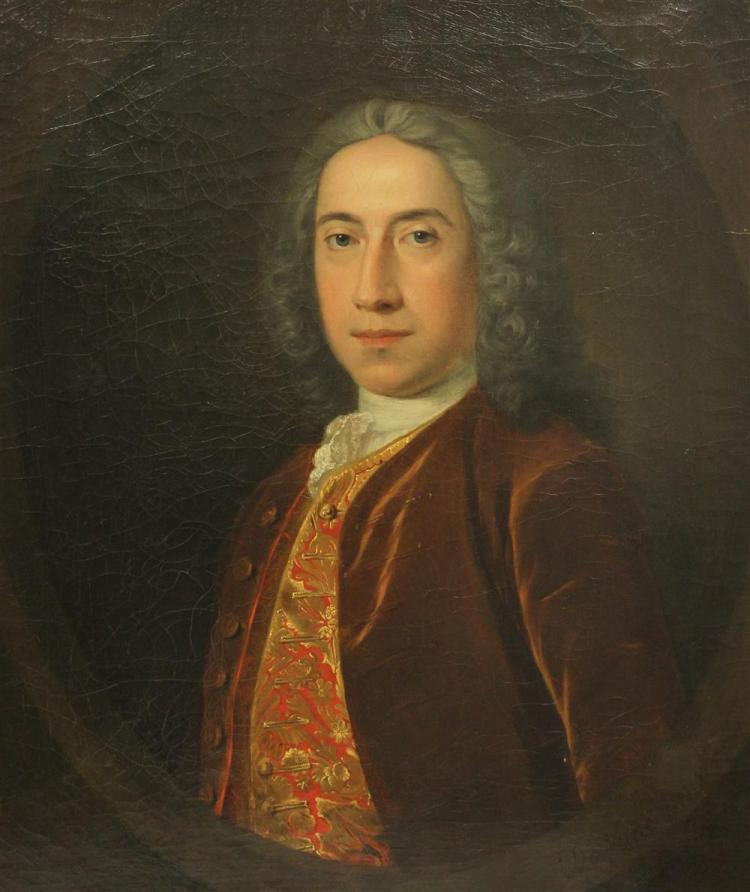
- portrait by William Denune
- Born: 1705; Scotland
- Died: 6 November 1784 (aged 78–79)
- Occupation: Merchant, slave trader, and diplomat

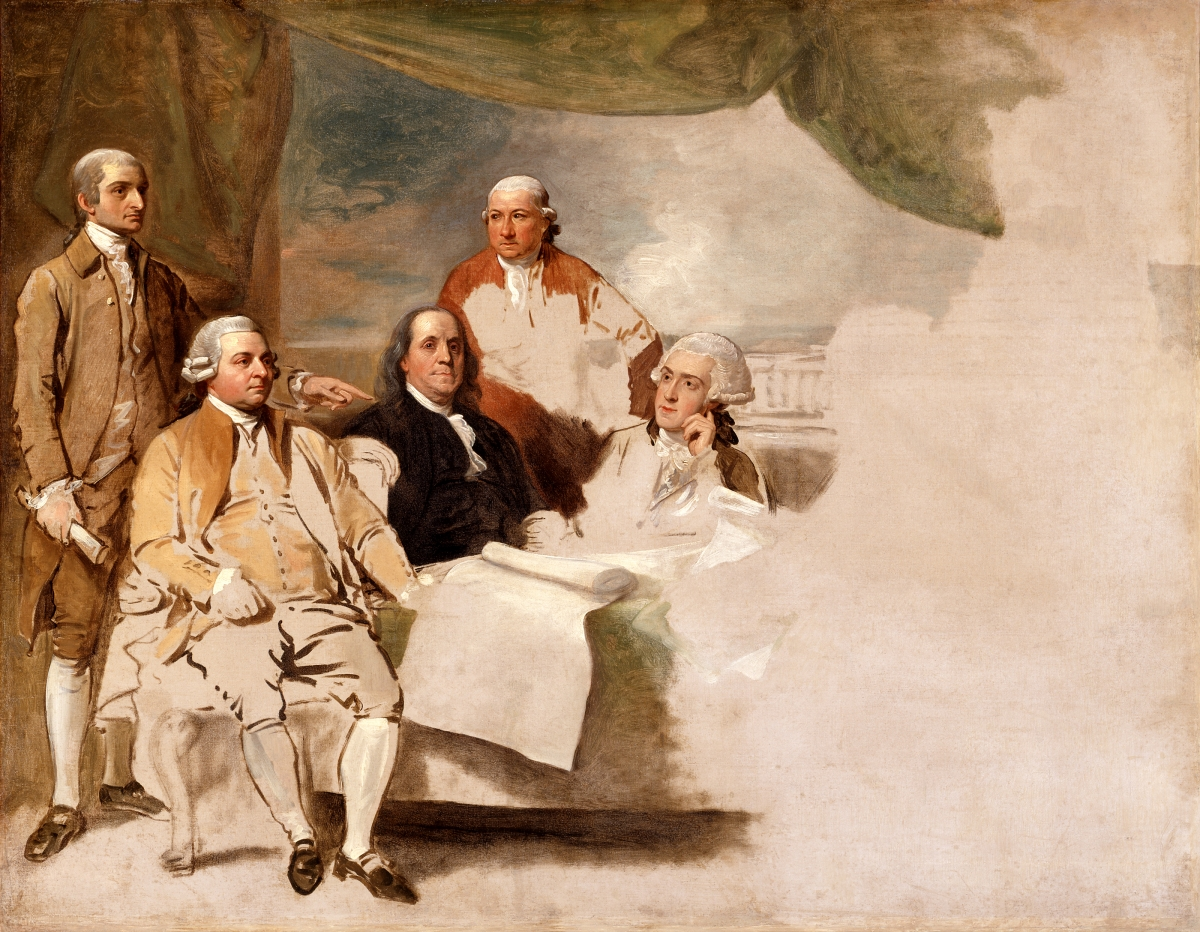
Treaty of Paris, by Benjamin West (1783), shows the American commissioners who negotiated the 1783 Treaty of Paris. Temple Franklin is on the right. Left of him are Henry Laurens, Benjamin Franklin, John Adams, and John Jay. The British commissioners did not pose for West, and the picture was never finished.

Richard Oswald (c. 1705 – 6 November 1784) was a Scottish merchant, slave trader, and diplomat. During the American Revolution, he served as an advisor to the North ministry on trade regulations and the best way to respond to the war.

Oswald is best known for being one of the British peace commissioners who negotiated the Peace of Paris in 1782.

== Early life ==
Oswald was born to the Reverend George Oswald of Dunnet, and his wife Margaret Murray. At age 20, he was apprenticed to cousins who were merchants in Glasgow, the brothers Richard Oswald (1687–1763) of Scotstoun and Alexander Oswald (1694–1766), sons of the Rev. James Oswald (1654–1698). As a young man he worked for them as a factor, travelling in America and the Caribbean. In 1741 he became a partner in the Glasgow firm.

== Merchant ==
Doing good business during the War of the Austrian Succession, Oswald in 1746 established himself in mercantile business in London. He leased a counting house at 17 Philpot Lane, where he initially devoted most of his time to the shipping and trading of tobacco. He took on a forage contract for the British Army, having in 1756 the merchant James Buchanan (1696–1758) as guarantor. He prospered also as a contractor during the Seven Years' War, particularly in the supply of bread in the German theatre, and was praised by Ferdinand of Brunswick.

Oswald bought the Cavens estate in Kirkcudbrightshire, and the Auchincruive estate in Ayrshire, in 1759. He made large additions of land to both estates, in the following decades. In British North America, he had large land holdings and owned slaves in East Florida, and held estates in both Georgia and Virginia. He ran down these holdings during the American Revolutionary War. He also owned plantations in the Caribbean.

=== Influence ===
Oswald was instrumental in directing British businessmen to promising locales in America for growing rice and indigo. Oswald directed British planter Francis Levett, who formerly worked for the Levant Company, to locations in the colony of East Florida for his plantations, and urged East Florida's Governor James Grant to make generous land grants to Levett, whom Oswald called his "worthy friend" to whom he owed "particular obligations."

Oswald put together deals with investors who had good connections, raising his own social standing. In his petitions to the Board of Trade and Plantations for the settlement of Nova Scotia plantations, for instance, he demonstrated an ability to bring together groups acceptable to the King. Those he put forward for Nova Scotia included: a former governor (Thomas Pownall); the cartographer John Mitchell; Member of Parliament Robert Jackson; MP and Paymaster for the Marines John Tucker; and a judge of the Marshalsea Court, and cousin of adventurer Sir Michael Herries, Levett Blackborne, who was himself stepbrother to Thomas Blackborne Thoroton, brother-in-law of the Marquess of Granby. This formula of connecting power-brokers was a key to his success.

=== Slave trader ===
In 1748, a consortium of Alexander Grant and Oswald, with Augustus Boyd (1679–1765) and his son John Boyd, John Mill (1710–1771), and John Sargent, purchased Bunce Island, on the Sierra Leone River. The Royal African Company had erected a fort there. Oswald and his associates gained control of other small islands through treaties, and established on Bance Island a trading station for factors in the trafficking of African people.

Oswald's extensive network of business connections served him well in building his slave-trading empire. The African Company of Merchants formed at this time had some close links to the Bance Island consortium, for example through Robert Scott and then George Aufrere.

=== Associations ===
Oswald had a cadre of young merchants whom he trained. Among these was John Levett, brother of planter Francis, who was in Oswald's employ as a young man. Levett (1725–1807) was born in Turkey to an English merchant father, and later settled in India, where he became a free merchant and invested in shipping, as well as becoming the Mayor of Calcutta. As a former trader in the Levant, Levett was ready to help Indian silk merchants supplant the former Mediterranean silk trade, which had fallen off. The British merchants were sensitive to the vagaries of fashion. Each year merchant Richard Oswald sent wigs to Levett in Calcutta, for instance. At the same time, Oswald associates like John Levett in Calcutta kept an eye on local trends, and adjusted their schemes to fit them. Levett, for instance, who had previously managed some German bread interests for Oswald, now planted cornfields in Bengal.

When Oswald needed Chinese labourers, for his own estates, he approached John Levett in Calcutta, who employed Chinese labourers in his Bengal operations growing arrack for his distilleries. The relationships between the various associates in Oswald's extended trading empire grew: John Levett was corresponding with Oswald about the marble chimney-piece sculptures that his brother Francis Levett was purchasing on Oswald's behalf in Livorno, Italy, where Francis was then living as a British merchant. Oswald was particularly close to the Levett and Thoroton families, as well as to the Duke of Rutland.

In letters to British General and East Florida Governor James Grant, Oswald confided that at one dinner of investors in East Florida and Nova Scotia that "Oswald had been dining at the Duke's with Lord Granby, Mr. Thoroton, and others where jokes passed round the table about the many settlements that would be needed to satisfy Mr. Thoroton's nine children." (The humor was explained by the relationships between the various families).

== Peace commissioner ==
In 1782, Oswald was selected by Lord Shelburne to open informal negotiations with the Americans, to be held in Paris. Because of his prior experience living in America and his knowledge of its geography and trade, he had been consulted frequently by the North ministry about matters concerning the war. Lord Shelburne chose Oswald because he thought his selection would appeal to Benjamin Franklin. Oswald shared Franklin's free trade commercial views; he possessed a "philosophic disposition"; and he had previously had a limited correspondence with Franklin. Franklin was impressed with Oswald's negotiating skills and described him as a man with an "Air of great Simplicity and Honesty."

== Treaty of Paris ==
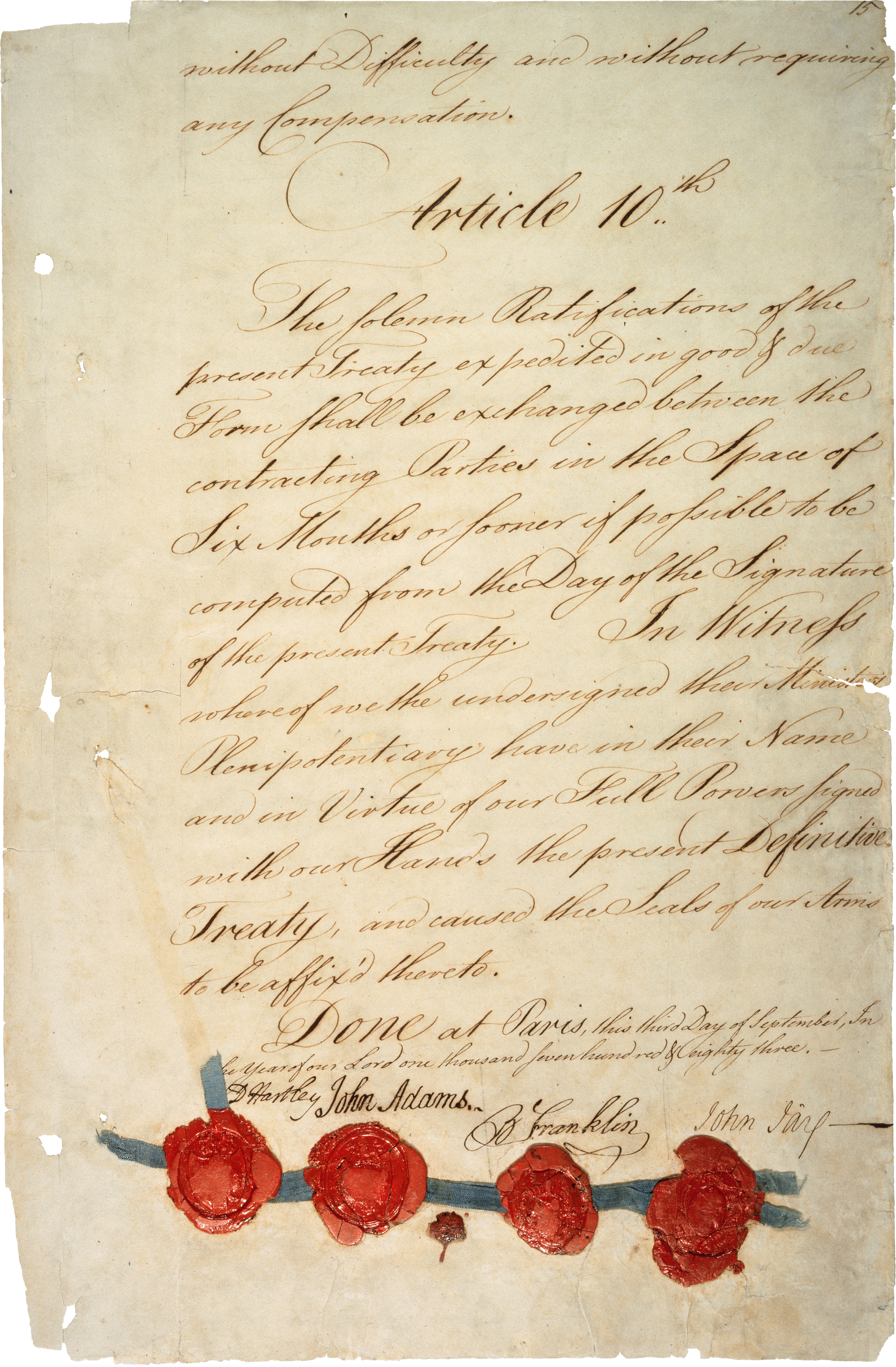
Signature page of the Treaty of Paris.

On 25 July 1782, official negotiations began. The preliminary articles were signed by Oswald for Great Britain, and John Adams, Benjamin Franklin, John Jay, and Henry Laurens for the United States on 30 November 1782.

With almost no alterations, these articles were made into a treaty on 3 September 1783. Oswald was criticised in Britain for giving the Americans too much. The Duke of Richmond urged the recall of Oswald and charged that he would "plead only the Cause of America, not of Britain." Oswald resigned his cabinet post and returned to his estate of Auchincruive in Ayrshire where he died on 6 November 1784.

Oswald was related to American soldier and journalist Eleazer Oswald.

After his death, his nephews and fellow slave traders John and Alexander Anderson, also with interests on Bance Island, were appointed executors of his estate.

== Works and legacy ==
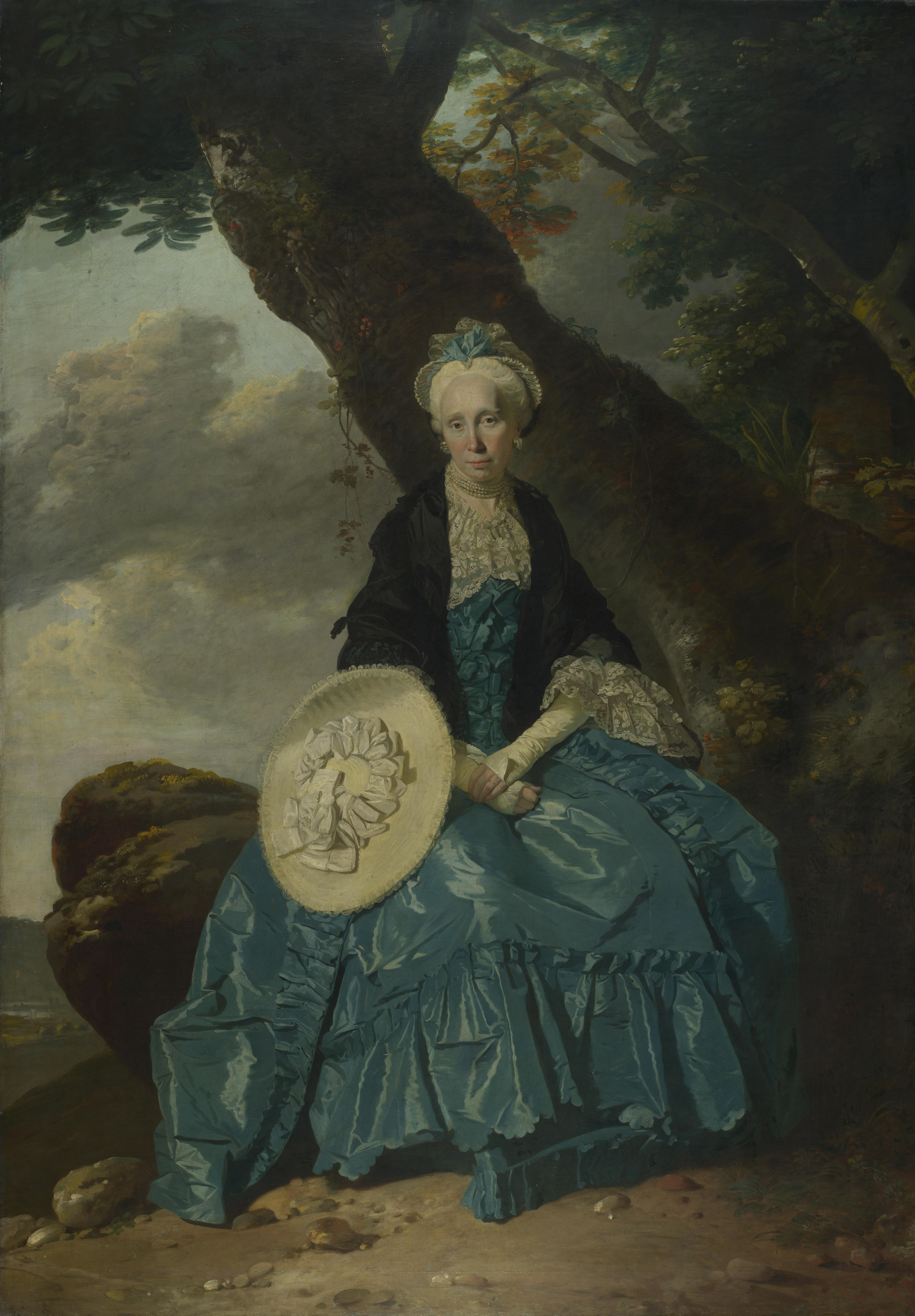
Mary Oswald, portrait by Johann Zoffany

Oswald's papers were among those relating to the peace negotiations acquired by William L. Clements, and then by the library of the University of Michigan.

Robert Scott Davis has identified Richard Oswald as "An American", the anonymous author of the encyclopaedic two volume American Husbandry (London, 1775).

== Family ==
Oswald married in 1750 Mary Ramsay (1719–1788), daughter of the merchant Alexander Ramsay (died 1738). She brought a dowry including property in Jamaica and British North America.

She died in London, and her funeral cortege took her body for burial in Ayrshire, having the effect of depriving Robert Burns of his lodgings. He wrote a hostile poem on the event, published in 1789.

Richard Oswald had illegitimate children before his marriage, but no children with his wife. His Auchincruive estate passed to his nephew the tobacco merchant George Oswald, son of James Oswald (1703–1793), his elder brother, known as a minister and writer.
