= Alexander Oswald =

Scottish landowner and advocate

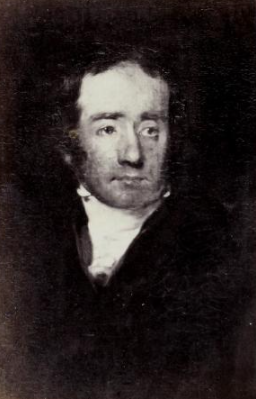
Alexander Oswald

Alexander Oswald of Changue FRSE (1777–1821) was a 19th-century Scottish landowner and advocate.

== Life ==
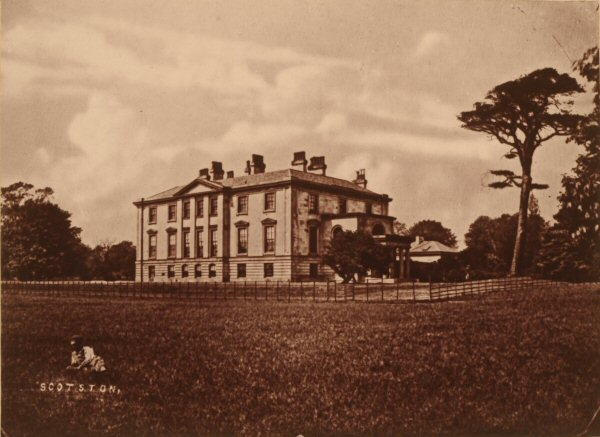
Scotstoun House

He was born in Scotstoun House near Glasgow on 1 April 1777 the fourth son of George Oswald and his wife Margaret Smythe.

Early in his life he inherited the estate of Changue in Dumfriesshire.

He studied Law and qualified as an advocate around 1800.

In 1810 he is living at 6 Duke Street (now called Dublin Street) in Edinburgh's Second New Townflat by, which was then a newly built flat designed by William Sibbald.

In 1821 (a few months before he died) he was elected a Fellow of the Royal Society of Edinburgh his proposer being Gilbert Meason.

He died in Bath on 4 April 1821. His will is held at the National Archive in Kew.

== Family ==
He married Miss Anne Dalrymple (d. 1820), youngest daughter of Sir Hew Dalrymple Hamilton of Bargany House[6]

== Artistic recognition ==
His portrait, by Andrew Geddes is held at Glasgow Museum Resource Centre.
