= Ravenscraig and Jameston Railway =

Railway line in North Ayrshire, Scotland

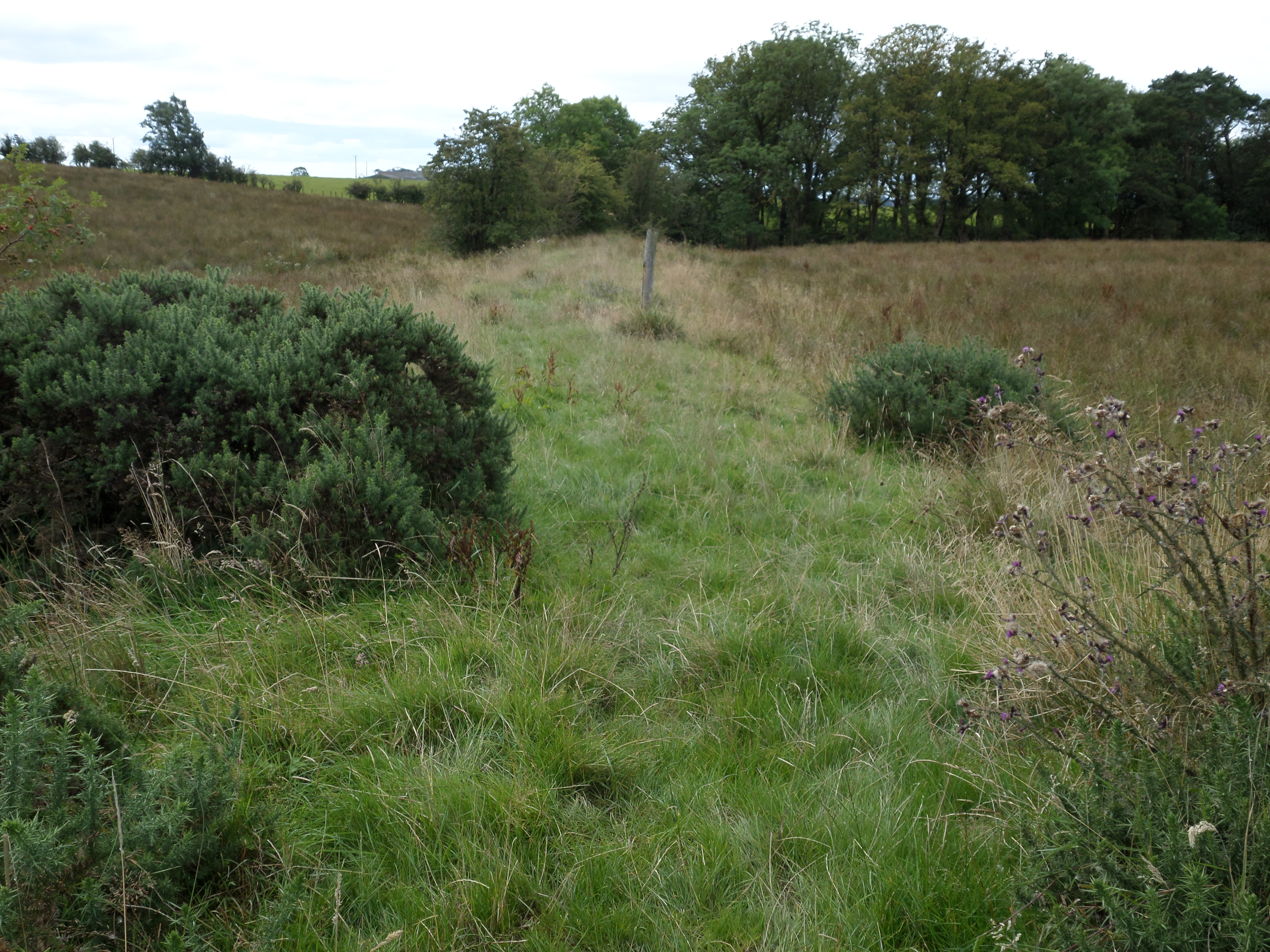
- A section of railway embankment and trackbed

Overview
- Locale: Dalry, North Ayrshire
- Dates of operation: 1856 circa–1895 circa
- Successor: Abandoned

Technical
- Track gauge: Narrow
- Length: 1 1/4 miles (2.0 km)

The Ravenscraig and Jameston Railway was a narrow gauge freight or mineral railway or 'Bogey line' that ran the 1 1/4 miles (2.0 km) between two freestone quarries near Dalry, North Ayrshire, Scotland.

== History ==
The Ravenscraig Quarry (55.695026°N 4.668213°W) to Jameston Quarry (55.683808°N 4.678430°W) line was a 'Bogey Line' using 'bogeys' or small waggons that transported freestone (sandstone) to another freestone quarry at Jameston near Auchenskeith for transfer into standard gauge waggons and onward transport via the standard gauge Glasgow and South-Western Railway's Dalry to Kilmarnock line. Probably mainly worked by gravity, manually and by horses, the width of the fairly substantial surviving embankments and some vague cuttings suggests that it was a narrow gauge rather than a standard gauge line. The Ordnance Survey maps of the time show that it existed after 1856 and was abandoned by 1895. Jameston Quarry was also disused by 1895 and has since been infilled. Old maps show that prior to the railway's construction stone could be taken away via North Lissens farm or across the Gorbie Glen and away via Asseyfaulds Cottage.

== Infrastructure ==
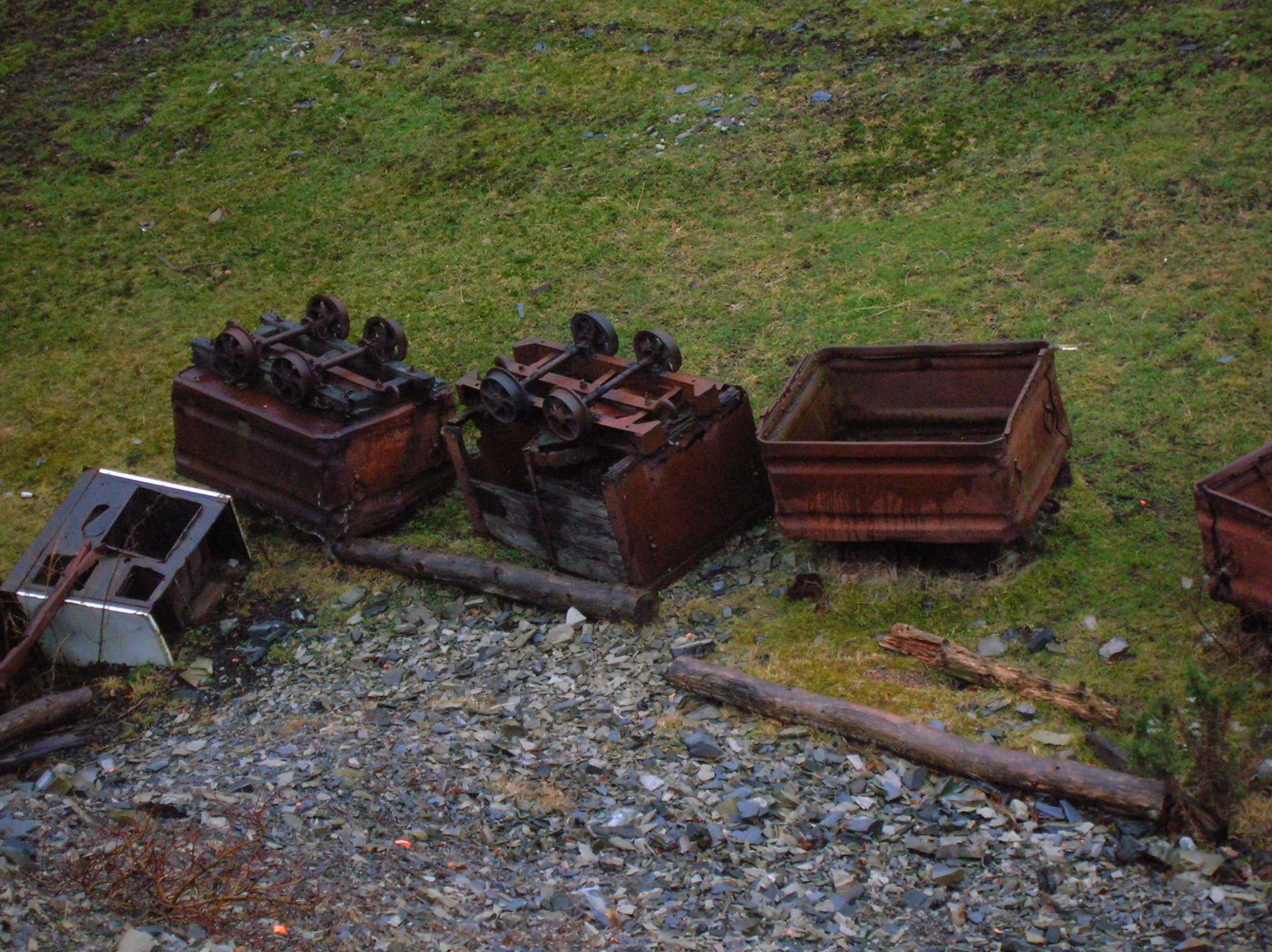
Typical narrow gauge railway waggons for carrying stone

The 1 1/4-mile (2.0 km) long line ran roughly north from Jameston Quarry with low embankments until it crossed the Lissens to Blair Mill road from where it cut across the field on a low embankment at first, progressing as quite a substantial embanked trackbed and at the end of the line branching into two sidings, again on embankments that ran to the western side of the quarry workings.

== The Railway and quarries today ==
The final section of embankments leading to Ravenscraig Quarry are largely untouched whilst they have been ploughed out in the field facing South Lissens Farm, but a section of cutting remains below South Lissens Farm and the trackbed survives as a farm track as far as the site of the infilled Jameston Quarry. Ravenscraig Quarry is now flooded but otherwise unchanged and is known locally as the 'Blue Waters' or 'Blue Hole' because the light shining off the dark vertical faces of the quarry workings once imbued the floodwater with a striking blue colour. The site was at one time a popular swimming hole; however, a drowning incident ended that and although rich in water plants such as the marestail (Hippuris) and pondweeds (Potamogeton the water has lost its blue colour and serves as an unofficial wildlife preserve. No rails or sleepers remain at the site.

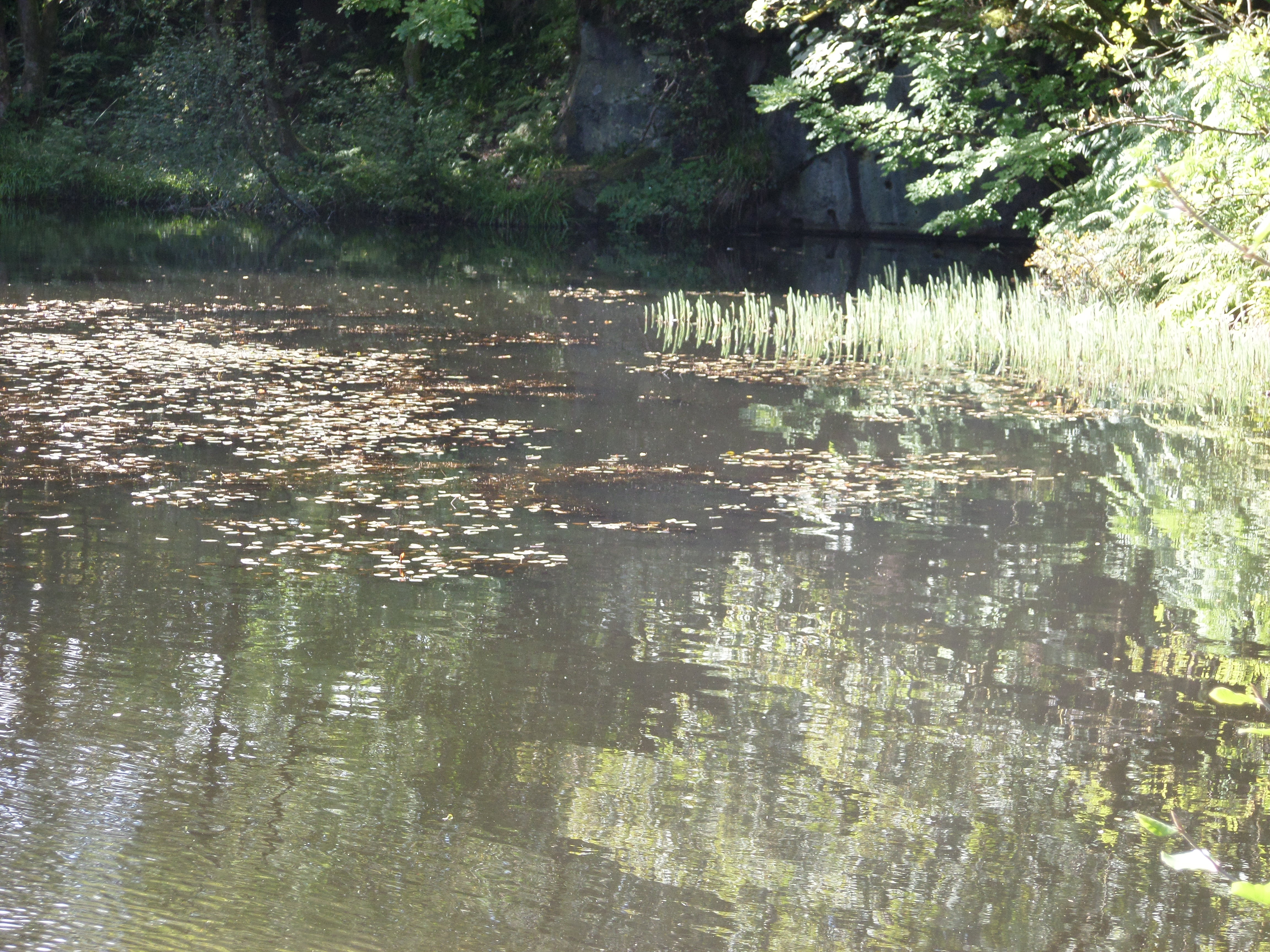
Ravenscraig Quarry or the 'Blue Water'

== See also ==
- Auchincruive Waggonway
