= Auchincruive =

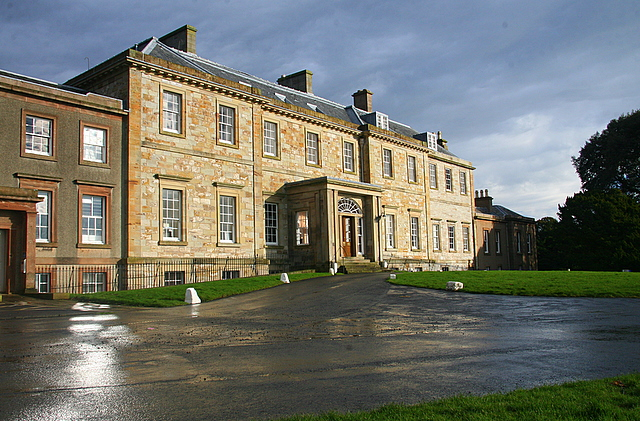
- Auchincruive House, once known as Oswald Hall

- Location in South Ayrshire
- 55.478466°N 4.552322°W
- Location: Ayr, Scotland

History
- Built: 1767

Site notes
- Architect: Robert Adam

Listed Building – Category A
- Designated: 14 April 1971
- Reference no.: LB99

Inventory of Gardens and Designed Landscapes in Scotland
- Official name: Auchincruive
- Designated: 1 July 1987
- Reference no.: GDL00031

Auchincruive is a former country house and estate in South Ayrshire, Scotland. It is located 4 kilometres (2.5 mi) east of Ayr, on the north bank of the River Ayr. Auchincruive House was built in the 18th century on the site of an earlier mansion. In 1927, the estate became the West of Scotland College of Agriculture, and the house was renamed Oswald Hall. The college became the Scottish Agricultural College in 1990. In 2007 the college announced that the site would be disposed of for redevelopment, and masterplan proposals were approved by South Ayrshire Council in January 2011. The house is protected as a category A listed building, along with other buildings on the estate. The estate is included on the Inventory of Gardens and Designed Landscapes in Scotland, the national listing of significant gardens. The house was returned to its original name of Auchincruive House in May 2020, the listed building records have also been updated to reflect this.

== History ==
The lands of Auchincruive passed from the Wallace family to the Cathcarts in 1374, although the first record of a house is in 1532, when a tower house stood on the site of the present building. The layout of the estate was formalised from 1723, to designs by William Boutcher, Sr. This included planting north and south of the river, as shown on General Roy's map of 1750.

In 1758 the estate passed to James Murray of Broughton, who sold it in 1764 to the merchant and slave-trader Richard Oswald, who built the present Auchincruive House. Robert Adam provided a design for a house to James Murray in 1764, although Oswald built the house, in modified form, in 1767. Adam's scheme for the interiors was carried out as planned. Adam also designed Oswald's Temple, a castellated temple or tea-house, which stands on a nearby hill and was completed in 1778. Oswald was appointed as the British peace commissioner who negotiated the Treaty of Paris in 1783 when the American War of Independence came to an end. After the negotiations, he retired to Auchincruive where he died the following year.

An east wing was later built onto the house, and alterations, including addition of the west wing, were made after the estate was inherited by George Oswald in 1819. In 1925 the estate was sold by the Oswalds to John Hannah, a local farmer, who bequeathed it in 1927 to the Secretary of State for Scotland, for use as the West of Scotland Agricultural College. Over the next 50 years, the college erected a number of buildings within the grounds to cater for their educational and research requirements. Oswald Hall continued in use, but the temple deteriorated, and in 2003 it was included on the Buildings at Risk Register for Scotland, its condition assessed as "very poor".

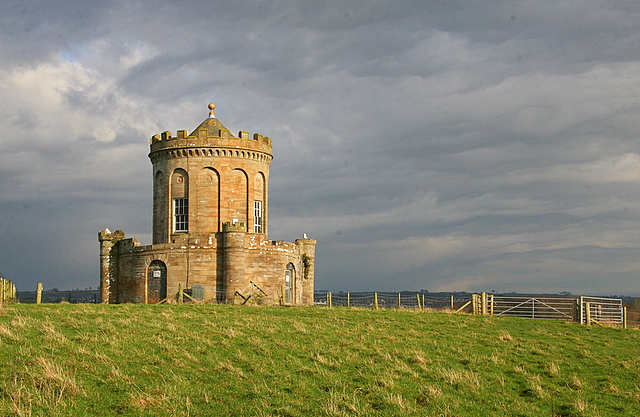
Oswald's Temple or tea-house

By 2007, the Scottish Agricultural College, formed in 1990 from the merger of the West of Scotland College of Agriculture and other agricultural colleges, had decided to move its educational campus to a new site in Ayr. Plans to redevelop the core of the Auchincruive site as a research facility, while selling off the remaining part of the 246-hectare (610-acre) estate for housing and golf course development, were approved by South Ayrshire Council in January 2011. The plans involve the restoration of listed buildings and historic landscape features, and construction of 400–500 houses and a business research campus. Oswald Hall would become a hotel and conference centre, with Oswald's Temple used as additional accommodation. However, in December 2012 Oswald Hall was sold for $1.5m (£1.0m) to biotech company Neogen Europe to be used as its corporate offices, with its Managing Director, Dr Stephen Holmes, being a former scientist at the college.

== See also ==
- Auchincruive Waggonway
- Wallace's Heel Well - William Wallace found shelter in the nearby Leglen Wood.
