= Stevenston Canal =

Coordinates: 55.636427°N 4.74508°W

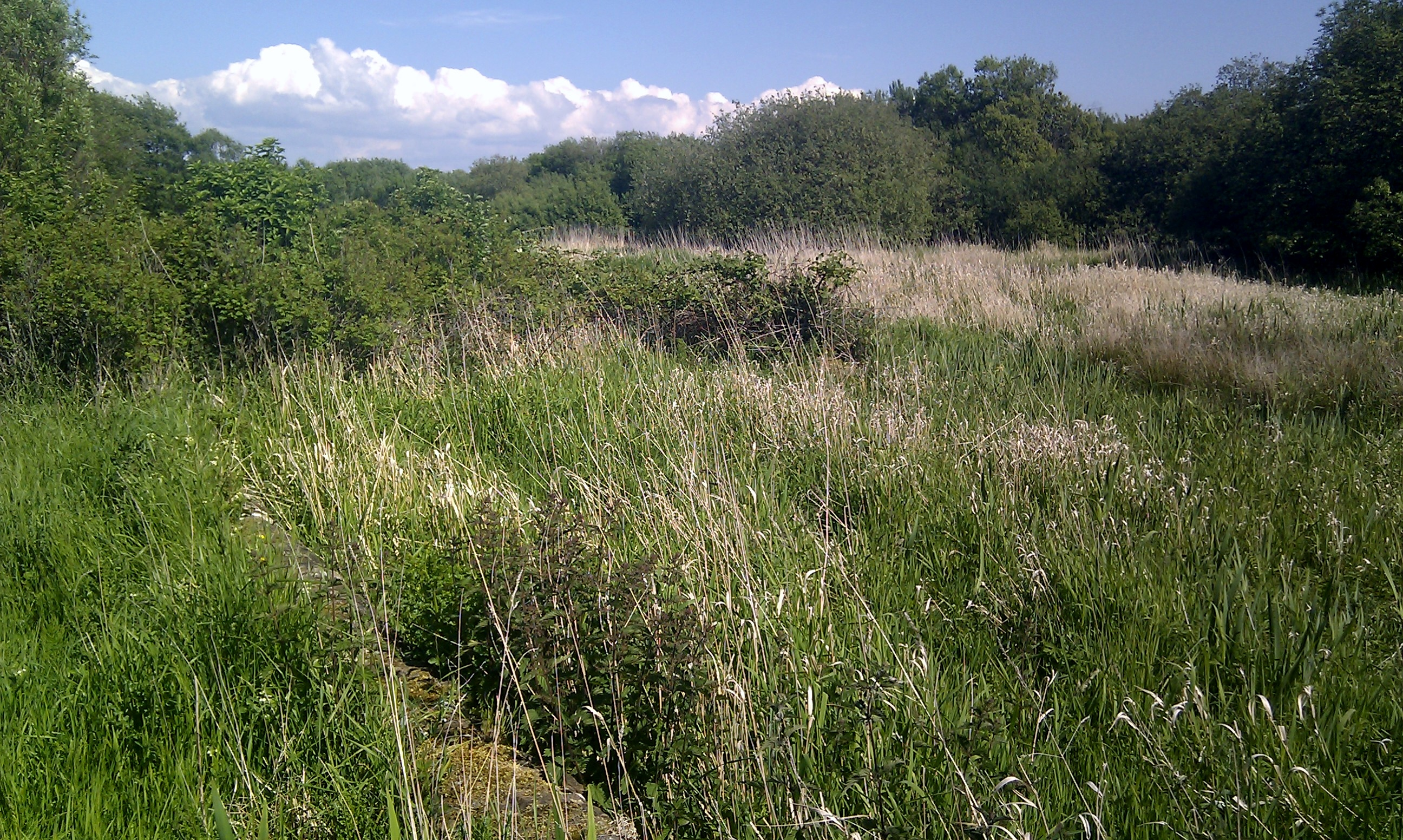
- A section of the old canal in Ardeer Park

Specifications
- Locks: 0
- Status: Mostly filled in

History
- Original owner: Stevenston Coal Company
- Principal engineer: John Warner
- Date of first use: 1772
- Date closed: 1830s

Geography
- Start point: Ardeer
- End point: Saltcoats

The Stevenston Canal was a waterway in North Ayrshire, Scotland, built for Robert Reid Cunningham of Seabank (now Auchenharvie) and Patrick Warner of the Ardeer Estate, which ran to the port of Saltcoats from Ardeer, and Stevenston with a number of short branches to coal pits along the length of the cut. The canal opened on 19 September 1772, the first commercial canal in Scotland. It closed in the 1830s, when it was abandoned following the exhaustion of the coal mines and the rise of importance of Ardrossan as a harbour. At the time of its construction it was said to be the "most complete water system of colliery transport ever devised in Britain."

== History ==
The canal was built by the coal owners to avoid the tolls charged on the road leading to Saltcoats harbour and also because the soft sandy ground made it difficult for horses to haul heavy coal waggons. Part of the canal in the Ardeer area was built along the line of the bogs and lochs that remained from the time when the River Garnock ran along this route, making Ardeer an island and Auchenharvie was situated at what was the mouth of the Garnock. The 'Master Gott' was a drainage ditch built by Patrick Warner to reclaim the bogs and lochans at his Ardeer Estate and sections of this were used in the canal.

The harbour at Saltcoats had been built by Robert Cunninghame who developed the mines on his estate and established salt pans that used the coal to produce salt that was the exported via the new harbour.

== The canal ==
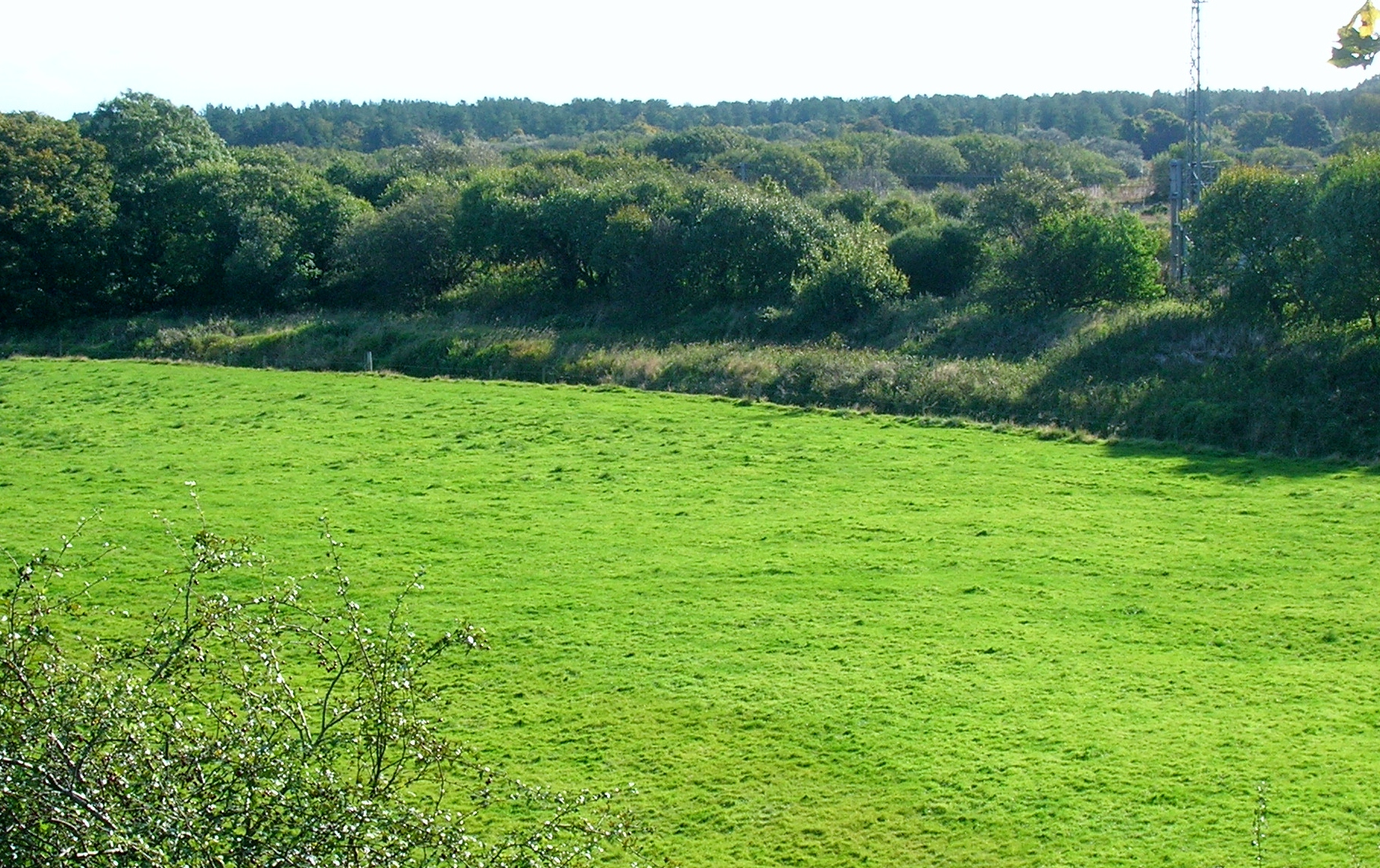
The canal near the Ardeer railway bridge.

The cut was 2 1/4 miles (3.6 km) long, 13 feet (4.0 m) wide at the top and 12 feet (3.7 m) wide at the bottom and 4 feet (1.2 m) deep generally, but deeper and wider in places because of the lie of the land as shown on Andrew Armstrong's map of 1747; the sides were angled at 45 degrees. The canal was fed by the Stevenston Burn where a spill dam controlled the level and also by water pumped from the various coal pits, such as the Dip Pit and the Raise Pit in what is now Ardeer Park.

Eight barges were built for use on the canal, each boat being able to carry between 12 and 15 tonnes (12 and 15 long tons; 13 and 17 short tons) of coal along the canal, as much as fifty horses and carts could haul on the road. The problem of blown sand from the dunes filling in the canal was reduced by waste from the pits being deposited as a bund on either side of the cut. The Saltcoats terminal was a coal yard with what may have been offices, about 600 yards (550 m) from the harbour, at a site now known as Canal Street. The Shott at the harbour ran inland and as a very hard igneous rock the cost and effort of cutting the canal through it was not worthwhile. The canal never therefore entered the harbour directly and after tolls were imposed upon the coal carts a railway was built along the Shott to the old harbour quay.

John Warner, brother of Patrick Warner of Ardeer supervised the construction. As developed by James Brindley and practiced elsewhere later, puddled clay was used to seal the canal; it brought in with difficulty by cart and took four months to build and cost the Stevenston Coal Company £4,857/4s. The transport of coal along it cost 3d per ton and the transfer from barge to cart to boat cost a further 8d per ton.

The canal had four branches within what is now the Ardeer Park, one running up as far as the site of Ardeer House on a circuitous route to avoid the stone quarry. The eastern end of the canal was branched, with one spur running to a pit in Hill Side Field and the other running to the Bogpit just below the small Broom Estate.

=== The waggonway and railway ===
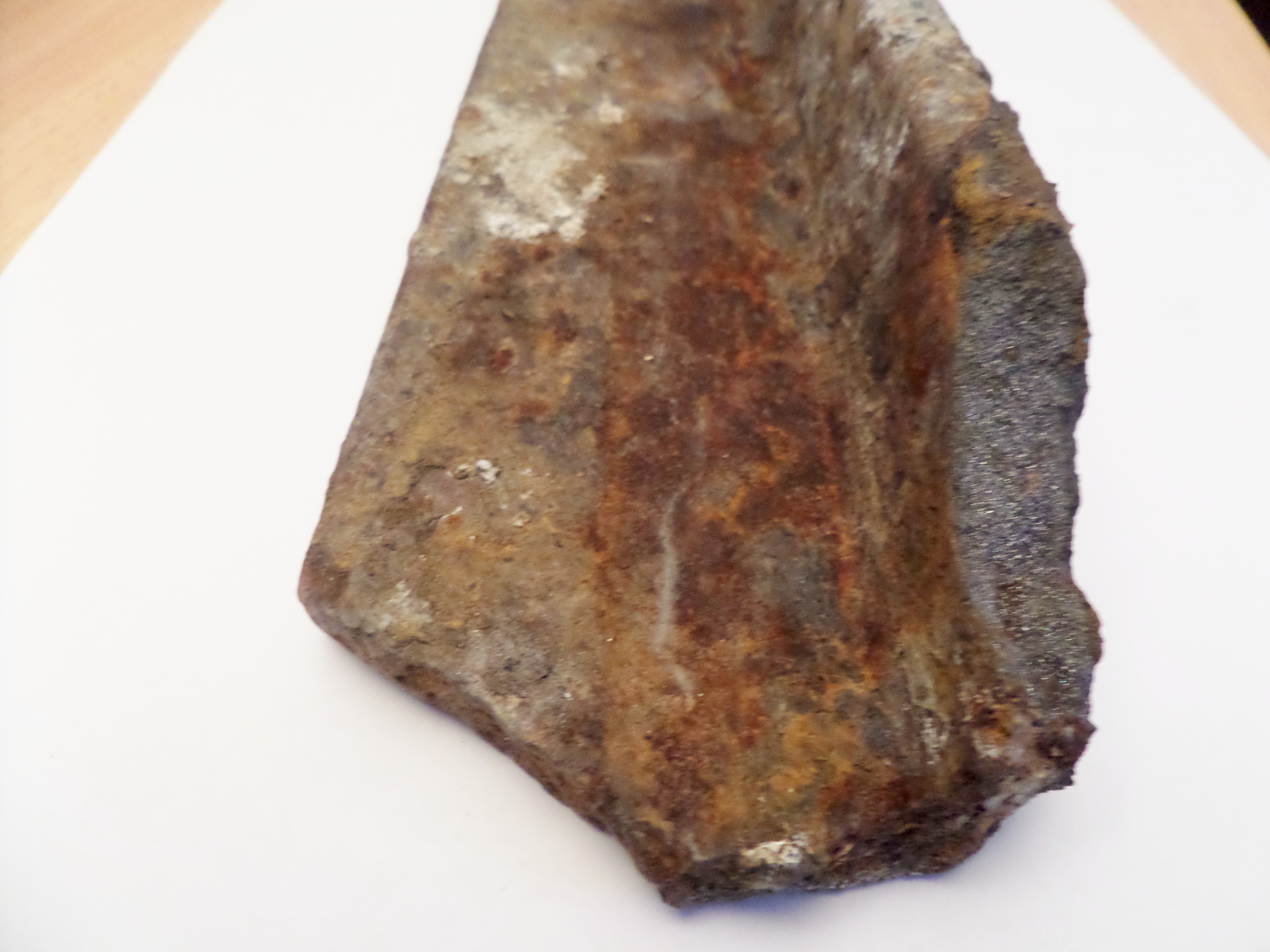
Section of old plateway showing wear from the waggon wheels.

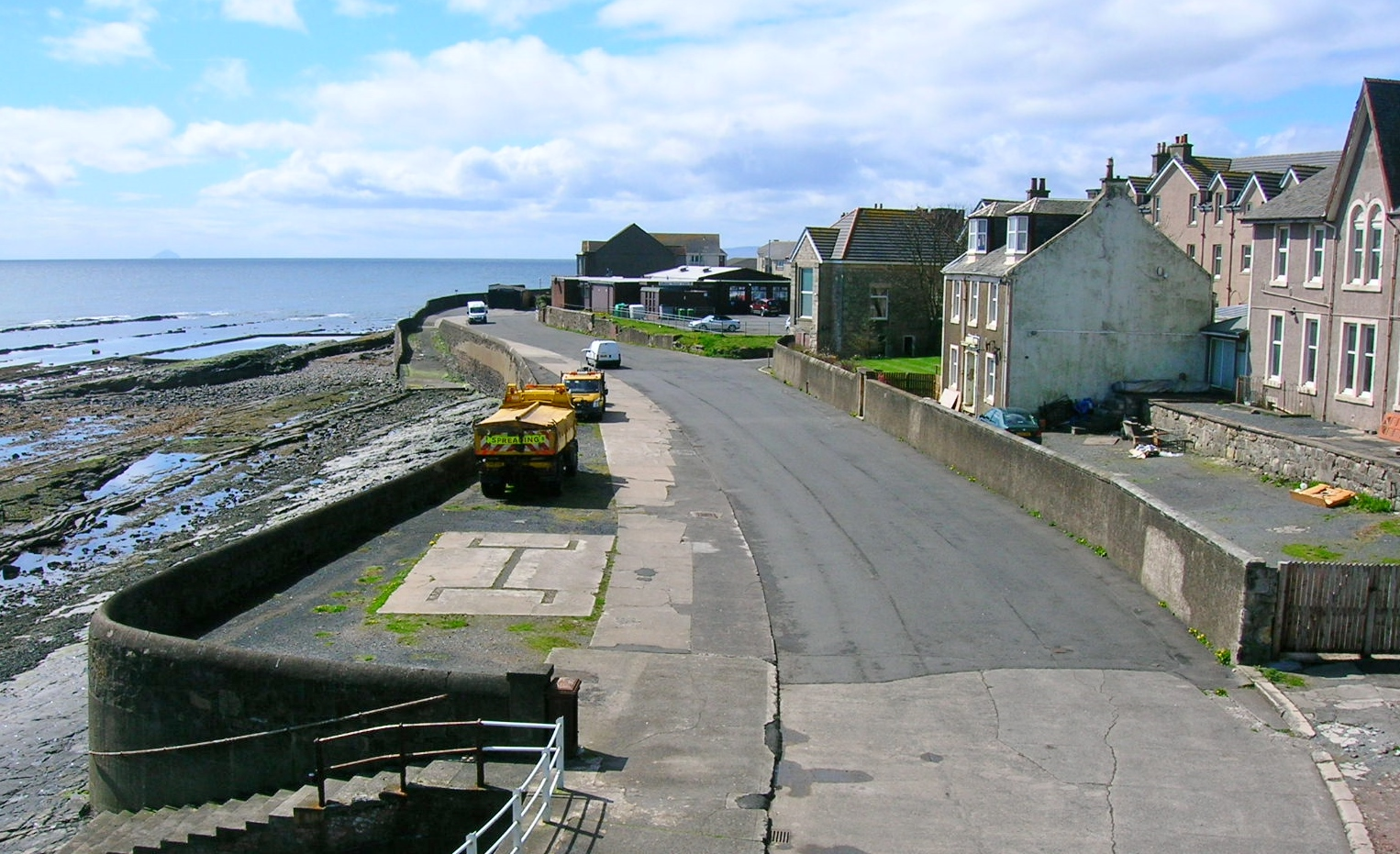
The site of the old railway to Saltcoats Harbour that ran from the canal coal yards.

The Earl of Eglinton obtained the right in 1805 to establish a toll gate and levy charges which at first came to £30 a year, however in 1811 they were increased tenfold and Robert Cunninghame decided to build his own waggonway to avoid this toll. The waggonway had at first wood rails attached to stone sleepers, the permanent way being built along the rocks of the foreshore, however the Earl of Eglinton disputed the ownership of the land. Local householders also complained that the waggonway restricted their access to the seashore as the high wall so characteristic of the harbour environs was built to protect the line from the sea. By 1812 the track had reached as far as the Saracen's Head Inn and as the earl failed to pursue the legal case the waggonway was completed and was in active use with the Stevenston Coal Company owning fifty horses used for hauling the waggons as well as towing the barges.

Another source states that the railway was built with cast-iron fish-bellied rails from the start after Robert Cunninghame visited the Kilmarnock and Troon Railway. The line had reached the coal quay by 1827 following an agreement with the Earl. This waggonway continued in use until 1852 when the export of coal from Saltcoats ceased and the line was lifted for scrap. It had been extended eastward towards the Bowbridge Pit near the Ardeer Stone Quarry, employing twenty men and horses. The canal may have largely fallen out use due to the railways construction.

In the storms of 2014, sections of 3-foot (0.9 m) lengths of cast-iron L-shaped plateway waggonway rails were found in amongst the spoil exposed from the old Auchenharvie Pit No.5.

=== Transhipment ===
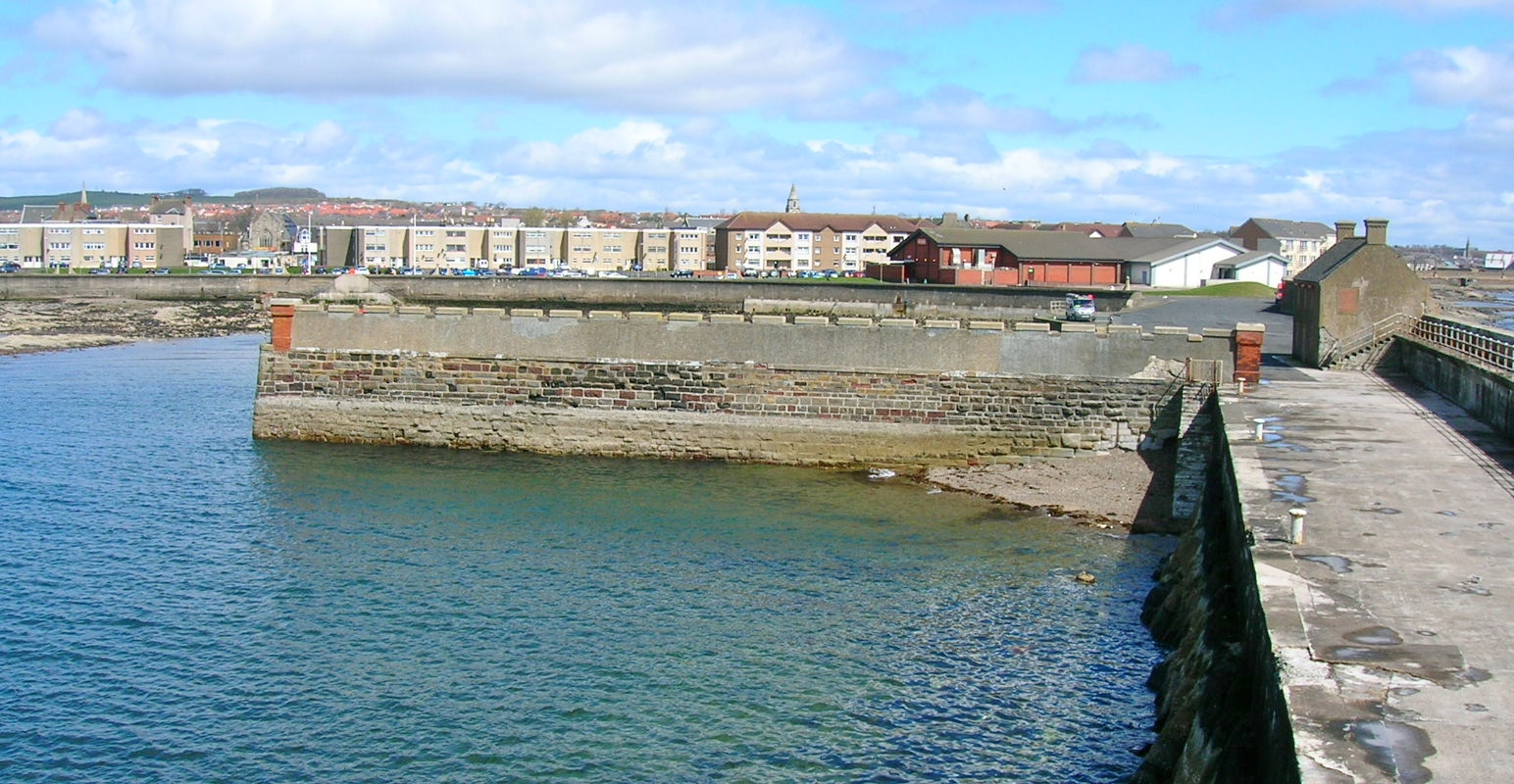
Cunninghame's coal quay at Saltcoats as seen from the Outer Harbour.

In 1798 Patrick Warner died and on his deathbed challenged the legal agreement with Robert Cunninghame, declaring it null and void. The courts appointed an inspector who reported on the canal and commented on the new method of loading known as a 'hurry'. The hurry

"separated the several sizes of coal, but was the occasion of much breakage and reduction of the coal, already too much reduced in size, by the imperfect and improper manner, it appeared to the Reporter, to have been worked and brought up from the pits. The pieces of greater size were flowed into the middle of the lighter, the two ends were reserved, but without any kind of division for the panwood, line coal, or slack, made by the breakage of the whole to be conveyed to coal yards at Saltcoats and the salt works there."

At the Saltcoats coal yards the coal was shovelled into carts and then taken the one-half mile (0.8 km) to the waiting ships where it was simply tumbled into hold causing more breakage and reduction in the coal size which was however said to suit the needs of the Irish market. The boats using the harbour could carry around 300 cart loads of coal at a time. 'Panwood' was a poorer quality coal not usually exported that was suitable for the saltpans.

== The canal remnants ==
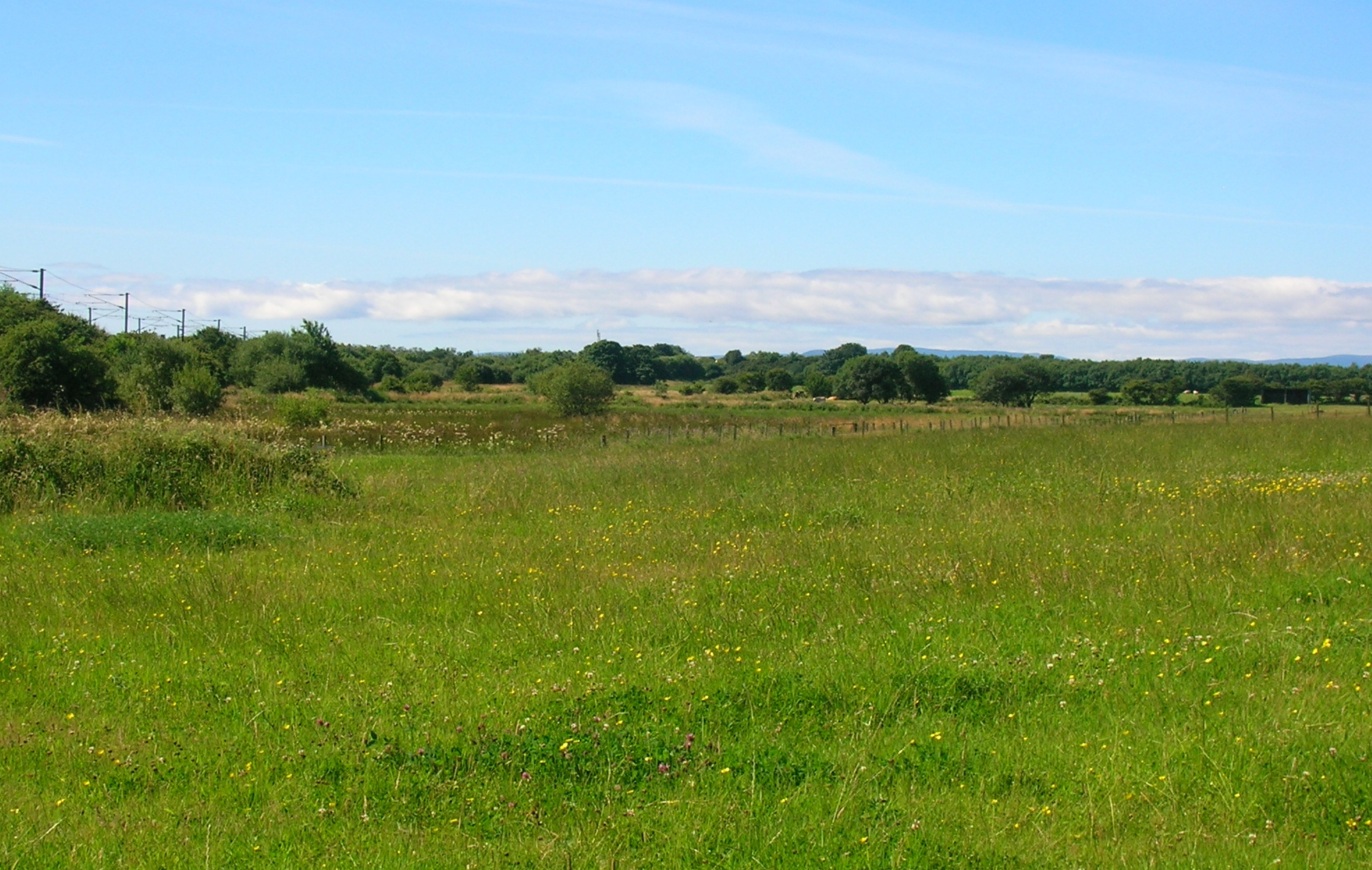
Site of the old canal cut near Broom House.

The 1856 OS map shows the probable line of canal with 'Canal Bank' and a 'Canal Cottage' still marked, the latter probably being used by canal workers, however in 2013 the only remaining parts of the canal cut lie within Ardeer Park at Stevenston as interpreted by an information board located there.

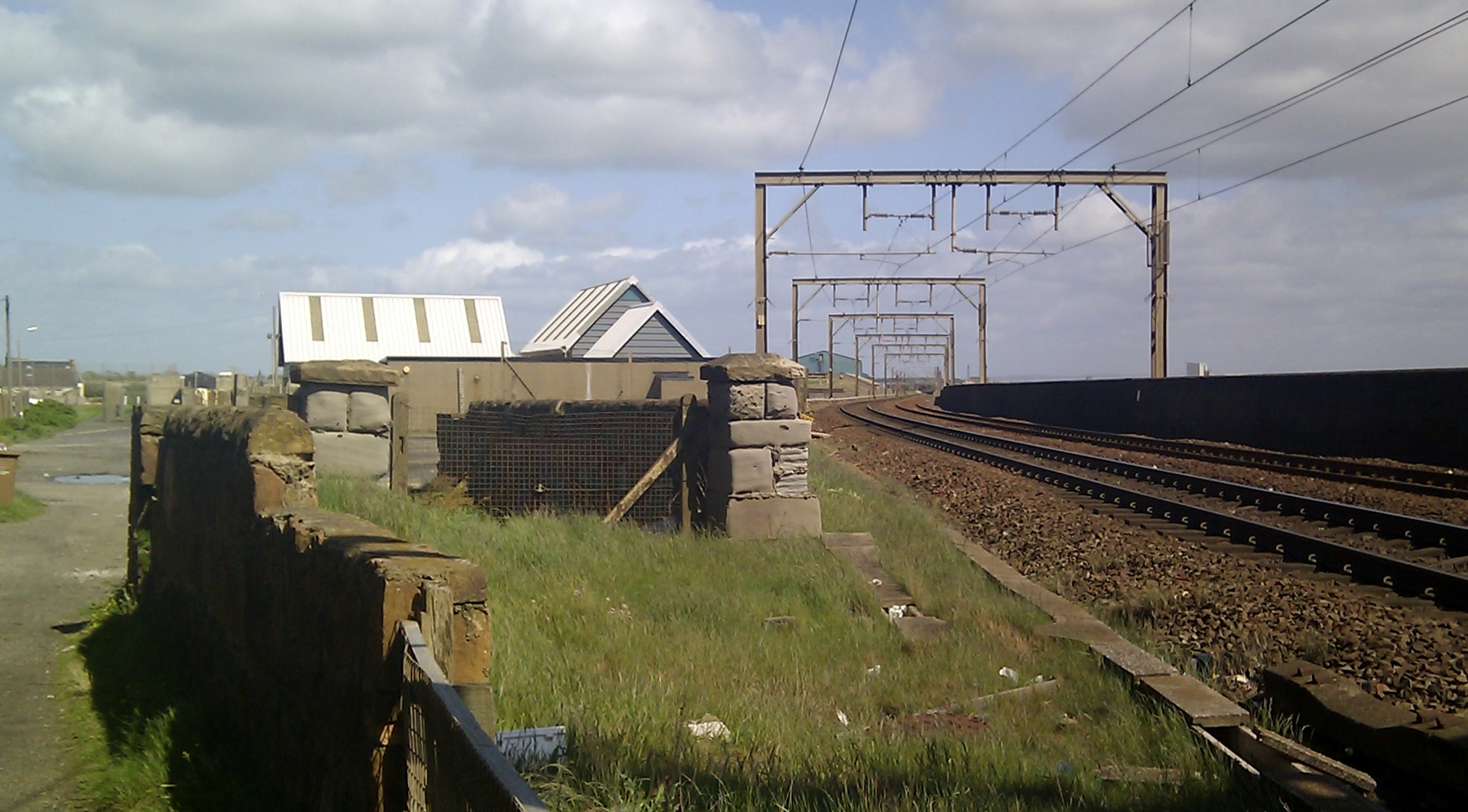
Old gatepiers with canal basin and coal yard site behind.

The canal is remembered by street names such as Canal Street and Canal Place. The 1860 edition of the OS 6-inch map marks a sluice at a site close to the old Stevenston coal pits, this being the eastern end of the canal navigation. It also marks a coal yard at the site of the old canal coal yard. The building of the Glasgow and South Western Railway contributed to the physical elimination of the old canal at the western end and also the associated railway.

The old coal yard and canal basin site remain as open ground and a pair of old gatepiers at the boundary of the railway may relate to the waggonway that ran down to the harbour.

Location of the Stevenston Canal, North Ayrshire

== See also ==
- Canals of Great Britain
- History of the British canal system
- Ardeer
- Stevenston Beach
- Auchincruive Waggonway

== Bibliography ==
- Wallace, Archibald (1902). Stevenston Past and Present. Archibald wallace.
- Clements, James (1974). Stevenston. The Kernel of Cunninghamme. Stevenston: Burgh of Stevenston.
- Graham, Eric J. (1997). Robert Reid Cunninghame of Seabank House. Ayr: Ayrshire Archaeological and Natural History Society. ISBN 0-9527445-2-X.
- Love, Dane (2003). Ayrshire : Discovering a County. Ayr: Fort Publishing. ISBN 0-9544461-1-9.
- Hughson, Irene (1996). The Auchenharvie Colliery: An Early History. Ochiltree: Richard Stenlake. ISBN 1-872074-58-8.
- "NLS Maps".
- "Canmore, RCAHMS".
