= James Hunter Blair (preservationist) =

British historical preservationist (1926–2004)

James Hunter Blair (18 March 1926 – 25 December 2004) was a noted Scottish historic preservationist, landowner and forester. His family's 2,000-acre (8.1 km^{2}) estate, Blairquhan, is located near Straiton in South Ayrshire, Scotland.

== Early life ==
Hunter-Blair was born in 1926 in Savoy House, Ayr, Scotland, the youngest son of Sir James Hunter Blair, 7th Baronet and his wife Jean Galloway McIntyre. His elder brother Edward succeeded to the Hunter-Blair baronetcy (created in 1786), upon the death of his father in 1985 and died on 21 October 2006.

== Career ==
After education at Eton, Hunter-Blair served during World War II with the Scots Guards in Germany. Following demobilization in 1948, he attended Balliol College, Oxford, graduating with a degree in history and embarking initially on a career in merchant banking in London. After three years, he was summoned back to Scotland to help manage the estate. Having acquired a knowledge of land management while working on one of the Buccleuch estates, he settled permanently at Blairquhan and began a long program of restoration and improvement to the castle and other buildings, and of the estate's woodlands and grounds.

Sir James Hunter Blair possessed an extensive knowledge of architecture, furniture, Scottish painting, music, angling, trees and garden design. He was chairman of Scotland's Historic Houses Association, president of the Royal Scottish Forestry Society, and chairman of the Ayrshire Rivers Trust. He served for 12 years on the Historic Buildings Council for Scotland, and was a trustee of the National Galleries of Scotland.

== Later years ==
Until retirement, he was the southwest Scotland representative of Christie's, the auctioneers. He was devoted to opera and also helped stage revues at the Gaiety Theatre in Ayr, including a memorable performance in 1956 – playing Julius Caesar on roller skates. In order to maintain Blairquhan's viability, he developed the estate for corporate entertainment, weddings and film location work. Whenever the Open Championships came to nearby Troon or Turnberry, up to 80 guests would find accommodation in the mansion, Milton, and in seven holiday cottages, converted from outbuildings.

He died on 25 December 2004, at the age of 78.

== See also ==
- Blairquhan Castle
