= James Blair =

James, Jim, or Jimmy Blair may refer to:

== Law and politics ==
- James Blair (1762–1837), an attorney general of Kentucky
- James Blair (South Carolina politician) (1786–1834), General of the South Carolina 5th Militia Brigade and U.S. Representative of South Carolina
- James Blair (MP) (c. 1788–1841), British member of parliament
- James G. Blair (1825–1904), American lawyer and U.S. Representative from Missouri
- James Blair (Australian judge) (1870–1944), Australian judge, lawyer, and politician
- James T. Blair Jr. (1902–1962), American politician; lieutenant governor and governor of Missouri
- James Blair (futures trader) (fl. 1970s), American advisor to Hillary Rodham Clinton and outside counsel to Tyson Foods (see Cattlegate)
- James Blair (political advisor) (born 1989), American political consultant and Trump administration official

== Military ==
- Jimmy Blair (soldier) (1761–1839), American Revolutionary War soldier
- James Blair (Indian Army officer) (1828–1905), Scottish military general, recipient of the Victoria Cross
- James Blair (Medal of Honor) (fl. 1870s), U.S. Army First Sergeant, recipient of the Medal of Honor during the Indian Wars

== Sports ==
- James Blair (footballer) (1883–1913), Scottish professional footballer
- Jim Blair (Australian footballer) (1874–1953), Australian rules footballer
- Jimmy Blair (footballer, born 1888) (1888–1964), Scottish professional footballer
- James Blair (cricketer) (1900–1961), Australian-born New Zealand cricketer
- James Blair (rower) (1909–1992), American Gold medalist in the 1932 Olympics
- James S. Blair (c. 1910–?), Scottish footballer with Third Lanark
- Jimmy Blair (footballer, born 1918) (1918–1983), Scottish footballer
- Jim Blair (Scottish footballer) (1947–2011), Scottish footballer
- Jim Blair (ice hockey), Canadian ice hockey player, see 1963–64 Boston Bruins season

== Others ==
- James Blair (clergyman) (1656–1743), Scottish-born American clergyman in the Virginia Colony, founder of The College of William & Mary
- James P. Blair (1931–2021), American photographer

== See also ==
- James Blair Middle School, a middle school in Williamsburg, Virginia
- James Hunter Blair (disambiguation)
