= James Hunter Blair =

James Hunter Blair or Hunter-Blair may refer to:

- James Hunter Blair (preservationist) (1926–2004), Scottish historic preservationist, landowner and forester
- Sir James Hunter Blair, 1st Baronet (1741–1787), Scottish banker, landowner and politician, MP for Edinburgh
- James Hunter-Blair (Ayrshire MP) (1817–1854), British Conservative politician, MP for Ayrshire
- James Hunter-Blair (Wigtownshire MP)
