= Girvan (Old) railway station =

Railway station in South Ayrshire, Scotland

Girvan Old Girvan, Girvan Goods
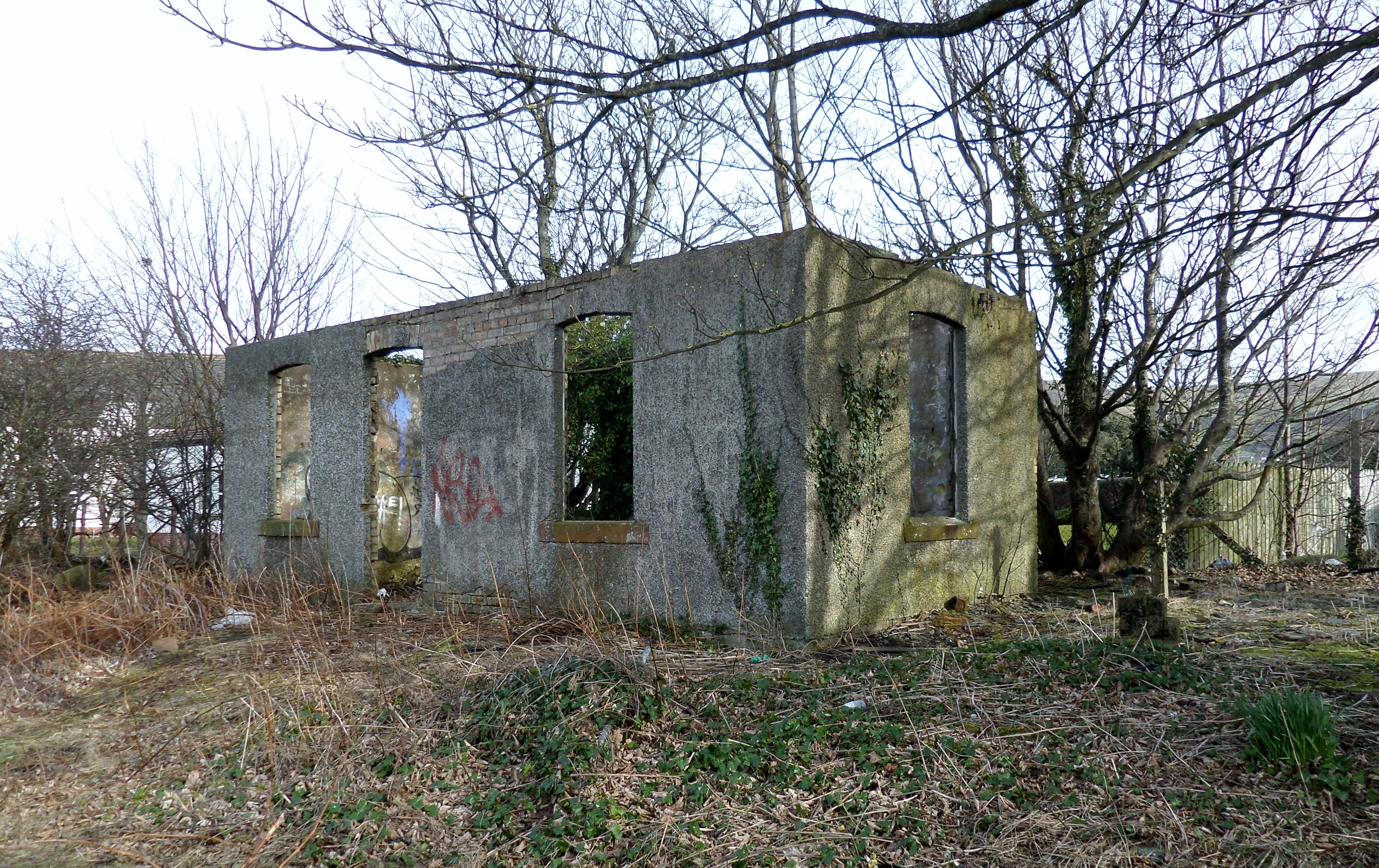
- Site of Girvan Old railway station

General information
- Location: Terminus of original line Scotland
- Coordinates: 55.246554°N 4.8546810°W
- Grid reference: NX 18596 98367
- Platforms: 1

Other information
- Status: Disused

History
- Original company: Maybole and Girvan Railway
- Pre-grouping: Glasgow and South-Western Railway
- Post-grouping: London, Midland and Scottish Railway

Key dates
- 24 May 1860: Opened
- 5 October 1877: Renamed
- 1 April 1893: Closed
Location

Girvan Old railway station was a terminus station opened in Girvan, in Carrick, South Ayrshire, Scotland by the Maybole and Girvan Railway. Although ambitions existed to extend the line through to Stranraer it was built on a site that would not permit this and so when the line was built the Girvan New station was opened on 5 October 1877 by the Girvan and Portpatrick Junction Railway on the route to Pinmore and eventually through to Stranraer railway station.

== History ==
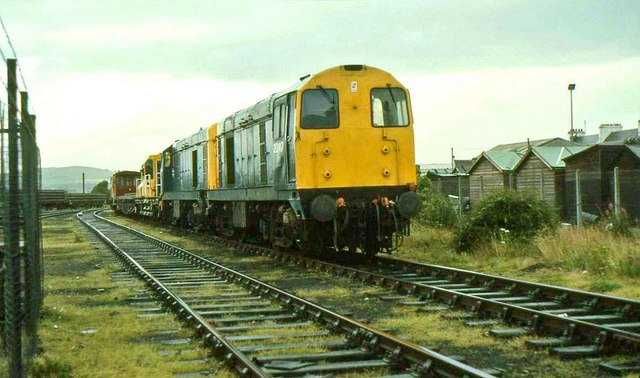
Girvan goods station in 1985.

The original Girvan terminus station was situated adjacent to the goods station that was established at the site. It was opened by the Maybole and Girvan Railway with only one short platform in 1860 and was retained as a goods station in 1877 by the Glasgow and South Western Railway who took over the running of the line to Stranraer. The Girvan New station was further from the town and this was not popular with passengers and it appears that trains called at either station for a short period of time. Girvan Old Station closed to regular passenger traffic on 1 April 1893 and the goods station remained in use. Another source states that Girvan New station at first only catered for the workings continuing south to Stranraer.

The remnants of the old station platform were still present in 1988 and were even visible in 2017 many years after the track was lifted.

== Station and goods station infrastructure ==
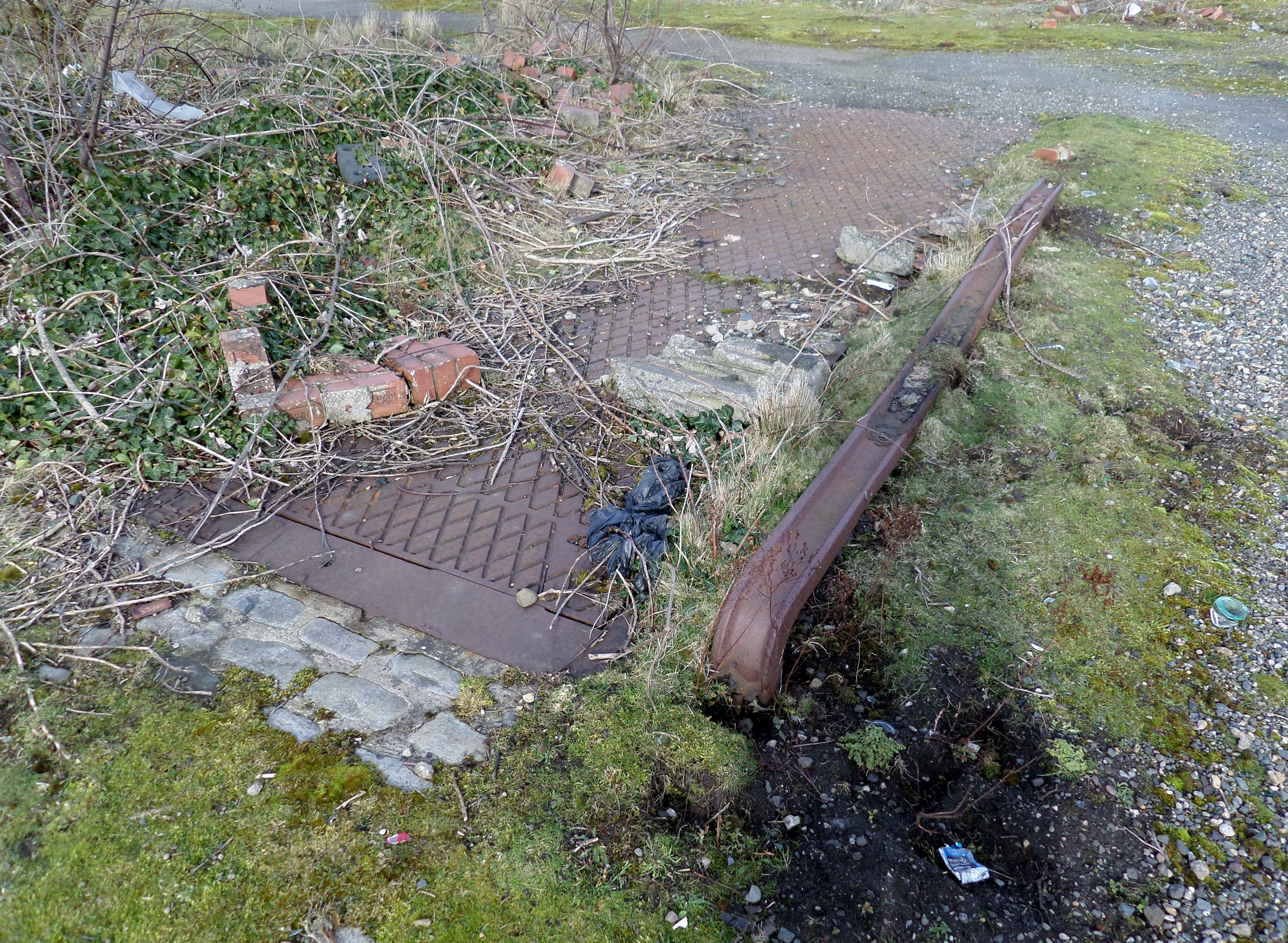
One of the old weighbridges.

Girvan Old had a single platform. The goods station had a number of buildings including a turntable, water column, weighing machines, engine shed that closed in 1940 and a coal yard with a bridge over the River Girvan that led to the harbour and jetty. The track was still in situ in 1989 however it had been lifted by 2014. The old Girvan terminus went out of use in the 1980s due to the poor condition of the wooden bridge over the River Girvan although ballast trains were still making use of the site.

== Harbour branch ==
The Glasgow and South-Western Railway built a line to the harbour from the goods station that involved a second bridge over the River Girvan and at the harbour jetty coal was emptied down a chute into waiting colliers that took the coal to Ireland. A network of sidings and two waggon turntables existed here. This arrangement only lasted until 1918 with coal coming from the Bargany Pit.

Preceding station	National Rail	Following station
	Historical railways	
Killochan	Glasgow and South Western Railway; Maybole and Girvan Railway	Terminus
