= William Clark-Kennedy =

Canadian soldier

William Hew Clark-Kennedy VC CMG DSO & Bar ED
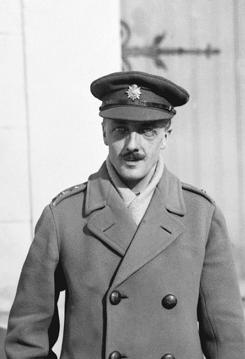
- Clark-Kennedy c. 1918
- Born: 3 March 1879; Dunskey, Kirkcudbrightshire, Scotland
- Died: 25 October 1961 (aged 82); Montreal, Quebec, Canada
- Burial place: Mount Royal Cemetery, Montreal
- Military career
- Allegiance: United Kingdom; Canada
- Branch: British Army; Canadian Expeditionary Force
- Rank: Lieutenant Colonel
- Units: Imperial Yeomanry
- Commands: 24th Battalion, CEF
- Conflicts: Second Boer War; First World War
- Awards: Victoria Cross; Companion of the Order of St Michael and St George; Distinguished Service Order & Bar; Efficiency Decoration; Mentioned in Despatches (4); Croix de Guerre (France)

William Hew Clark-Kennedy, VC, CMG, DSO & Bar, ED (3 March 1879 – 25 October 1961) was a British-born Canadian soldier and a recipient of the Victoria Cross, the highest award for gallantry in the face of the enemy that can be awarded to British and Commonwealth forces.

== Family ==
William Clark-Kennedy was born on 3 March 1879 at Dunskey House, near Portpatrick on the Scottish Rhins of Galloway. His mother was Lettice Lucy Hewitt (c. 1853–1930), a daughter of the Fourth Viscount of Lifford. His father was Captain Alexander William Maxwell Clark-Kennedy (Irish Guards) of Knockgray, Galloway (-1894).

== Victoria Cross ==
William Clark-Kennedy was 39 years old, and a lieutenant colonel commanding the 24th Battalion (Victoria Rifles of Canada), Canadian Expeditionary Force, during the First World War when the following deed took place for which he was awarded the VC.

On 27/28 August 1918 on the Fresnes-Rouvroy line, France, the brigade of which Lieutenant Colonel Clark-Kennedy's battalion was a central unit suffered heavy casualties. At this juncture the colonel encouraged his men and led them forward, then by controlling the direction of neighbouring units and collecting stragglers he enabled the whole brigade front to advance. Next day he was severely wounded, but despite intense pain and loss of blood, he refused to be evacuated until he had gained a position from which the advance could be resumed.

Clark-Kennedy is buried at Mount Royal Cemetery, Montreal, Quebec, Canada (Pine Hill Section, Reford Family Plot, Lot 258).

== Freemasonry ==
He was Initiated into Freemasonry in St Paul's Lodge, No. 12, (Montreal, Canada) on 6 February, Passed on 10 April and Raised 8 May 1906.
