= James Hunter-Blair (Ayrshire MP) =

British politician

Member of Parliament for Ayrshire
- In office 22 July 1852 – 5 November 1854
- Preceded by: Alexander Haldane Oswald
- Succeeded by: James Fergusson

Personal details
- Born: 22 March 1817
- Died: 5 November 1854 (aged 37) Inkerman, Taurida Governorate, Russian Empire
- Cause of death: Gunshot
- Party: Conservative
- Parent(s): Sir David Hunter-Blair, 3rd Baronet; Dorothea Hay-Mackenzie

Colonel James Hunter-Blair (22 March 1817 – 5 November 1854) was a British Conservative politician.

== Family ==
He was the eldest son of Sir David Hunter-Blair, 3rd Baronet and Dorothea née Hay-Mackenzie. While he was intended to inherit the Baronetcy of Dunskey, Wigtown upon his father's death, his own premature death meant his younger brother, Edward, succeeded to the title.

== Member of Parliament ==
In public service, Hunter-Blair was a Deputy Lieutenant for Ayrshire in 1845, before being elected Conservative MP for the county constituency at the 1852 general election and held the seat until his death in 1854.

== Death ==
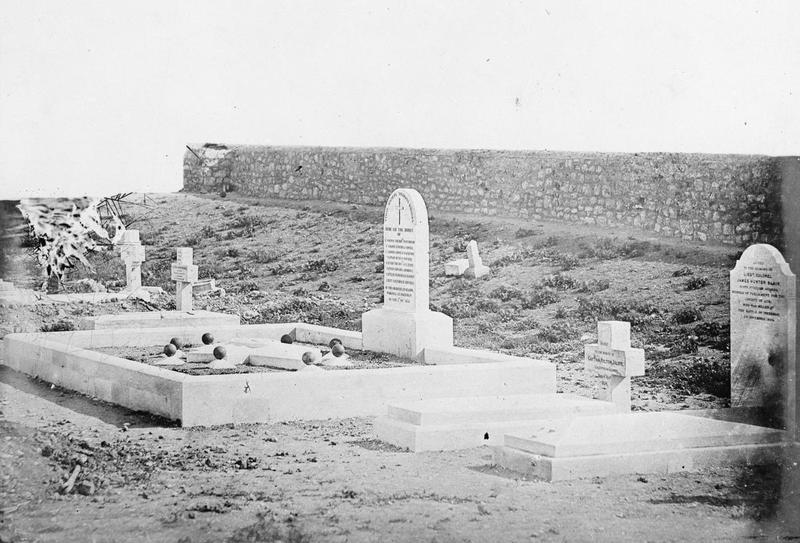
Graves of officer who fell at the Battle of Inkerman, including Hunter-Blair's

An active member of the military, Hunter-Blair was a Lieutenant-Colonel in the Scots Fusilier Guards from 1848, and was drafted to fight in the Crimean War, ultimately leading to his death at the Battle of Inkerman in 1854, which caused deep shock and sadness among his parliamentary colleagues. In a letter to Lady Elizabeth Jocelyn—Lady Londonderry and wife of Frederick Stewart, 4th Marquess of Londonderry—a few weeks after Blair's death, future prime minister Benjamin Disraeli said:

"Poor Hunter Blair. He was an able & zealous member of my parliamentary staff, & I saw him a day, or two, before his departure, & our last words, almost, were as to the chance of Adolphus [Lord Adolphus Vane] going out.
"...Hunter Blair, poor dear Hunter Blair, haunts me. He took us to Chobham! [the site of a military exercise in 1853]!"

And, in a separate letter to Sarah Brydges Willyams in December 1854, Disraeli described Blair as "one of my most active aid-de-camps, & really invaluable both as a partisan & a friend", adding his death was a "severe loss to me".

In a later letter to Disraeli, Conservative MP for Petersfield William Jolliffe said: "Poor Blair is a sad loss to our party. No one was of greater use to Taylor & I than he was, and on many occasions did excellent service." Meanwhile, James Harris, 3rd Earl of Malmesbury, the Secretary of State for Foreign Affairs, stated: "Blair cannot be replaced for those who knew & liked him, either as a partisan or friend."

He is commemorated by the Colonel Hunter Blair Monument, a stone obelisk on Highgate Hill, Straiton, near the Hunter-Blair family home Blairquhan Castle.

Parliament of the United Kingdom
Preceded by Alexander Haldane Oswald	Member of Parliament for Ayrshire; 1852–1854	Succeeded by James Fergusson
