= Ganten =

Chinese bottled water brand

Ganten 景田
- Country: China
- Website: www.ganten.com.cn
- All concentrations in milligrams per liter (mg/L); pH without units

Ganten (Chinese: 景田; pinyin: Jǐngtián; Jyutping: ging2 tin4) is a premium bottled water brand from China. The brand is owned by Shenzhen Ganten Food & Beverage Co., Ltd, a company headquartered in Shenzhen, Guangdong Province. The best-known sub-brand of "Ganten" is Baisuishan (Chinese: 百岁山; pinyin: bǎi suì shān), or Hundred Year Old Mountain.

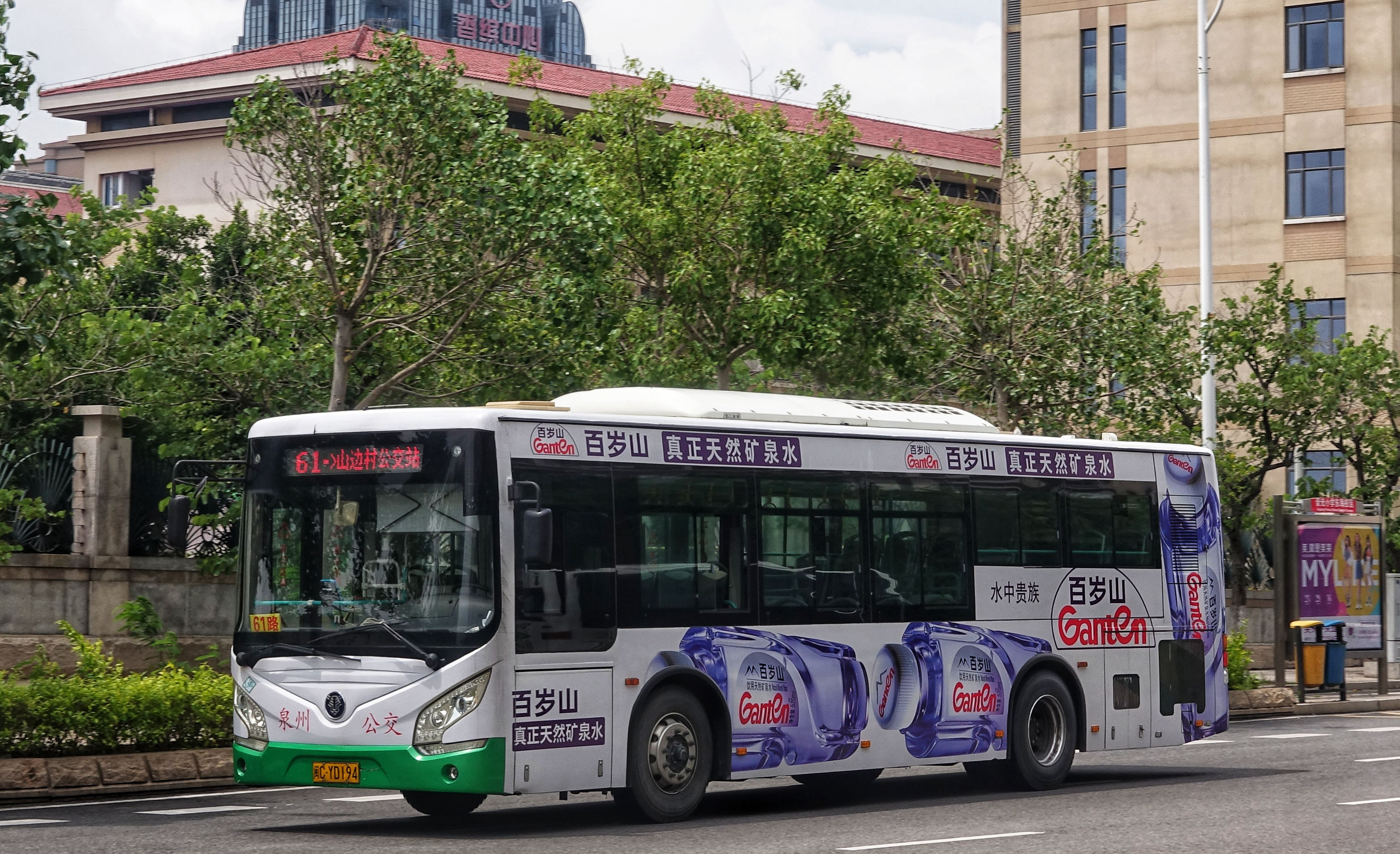
Advertisement, mineral water Baisuishan (百岁山).

== History ==
Shenzhen Jingtian Food and Beverage Co., Ltd. was established in 1992 in Shenzhen.

Between 2015 and 2017, Shenzhen Ganten's domestic market share in the Chinese bottled water retail market had grown to 3% from 2.4%.

The company's Latinised name is "Ganten", an approximation of the Cantonese pronunciation of the company's name, which is pronounced "Jingtian" in Mandarin. It uses a number of sub-brands for its products in Chinese, including "Ganten" (景田) itself, but the most commonly seen product brand is "Baisuishan", or "Hundred Year Old Mountain". Product packaging often carries the Latinised name "Ganten", but does not Latinise the product brand. As a result, "Baisuishan" branded bottled water is referred to in English simply as "Ganten".

== Commercials ==
A series of commercials for Ganten Water was filmed in Scotland. It was produced by Freakworks, based in Edinburgh: "Ganten: Mesmerise" (2013), filmed in Edinburgh and "Ganten: Source", filmed at Glasgow City Chambers, Stirling Castle, and Smoo Cave in Durness. Both were directed by Hamish Allison and feature the Poland-born model Magdalena Zalejska. The third in the series was also filmed in Edinburgh. The fourth in the series was filmed in 2015 at Dean Village. Another commercial, "Ganten: Pure", was filmed at Blairquhan Castle. Another commercial featuring Jing Tian and Donny Lewis was filmed at Winton Castle. Ganten water is sourced from Huizhou, in Guangdong Province.

== See also ==
- Blairquhan Castle, acquired in 2012 by Ganten Scotland
