= Tairlaw Linn =

Coordinates: 55.27734°N 4.50779°W

Tairlaw Linn is a waterfall of Scotland, near Straiton, South Ayrshire.

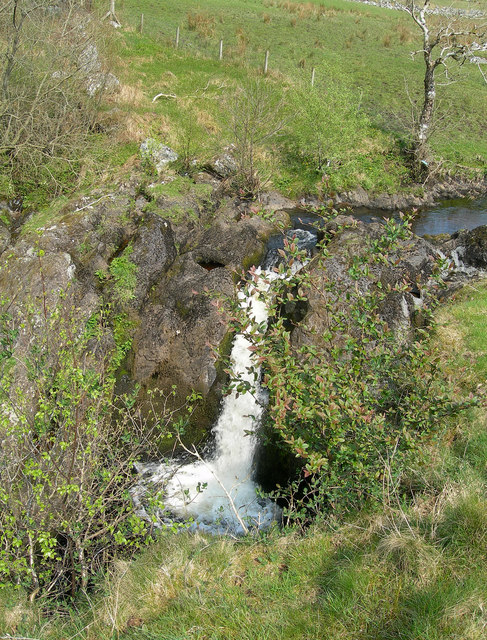
The start of Tairlaw Linn, the first of a set of waterfalls on the Water of Girvan close to Tairlaw Farm

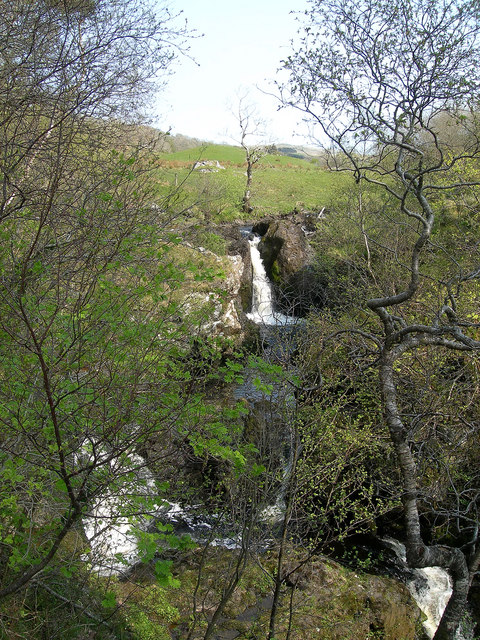
At the middle part of Tairlaw Linn – viewed here from the north bank through the woodland – the Water of Girvan splits into several short waterfalls. Below this, the waterfall makes a spectacular drop into a deep plunge pool.

== See also ==
- Waterfalls of Scotland
