= Edward Hay Mackenzie Elliot =

British soldier

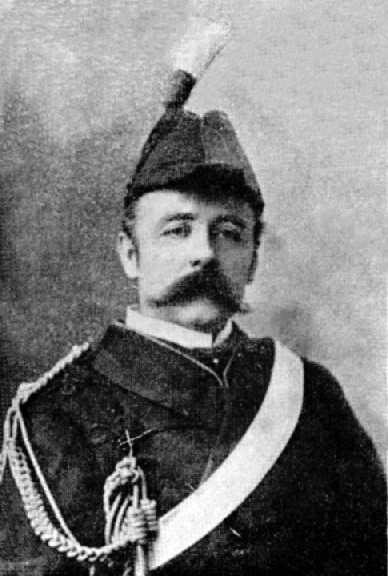
Elliot in 1897

Major Edward Hay Mackenzie Elliot (30 November 1852 – 5 December 1920) was a Scot who served as Private Secretary to David Boyle, 7th Earl of Glasgow while he was Governor of New Zealand in the 1890s. He twice played football for Scotland in the unofficial international matches in 1871 and 1872.

== Early life and education ==
Elliot was born at Vizagapatam, India, the son of Walter Elliot (1803–1887), the Scottish naturalist, and Maria Dorothea Hunter Blair (c.1816–1890). His mother was the daughter of Sir David Hunter-Blair, 3rd Baronet.

Elliot was educated at Windlesham House School, near Washington, West Sussex and Harrow from January 1867 to Easter 1870.

== Football career ==
Elliot played football for Harrow Chequers, before joining the Wanderers club, making his debut for them in a 5–0 victory over Forest School on 28 November 1871. He continued to appear regularly for the Wanderers over the next two years, with his final game coming on 22 March 1873. In the 1873 Football Annual, he was described as "a truly ponderous fellow but successful as a dribbler withal; has been known to kick a goal."

He was selected to represent Scotland in the representative matches against England on 18 November 1871 and 24 February 1872, playing as a forward in the first match, won 2–1 by England, and as a back in the second match, which England won 1–0.

Later in life, he also played cricket for the Marylebone Cricket Club, making four listed appearances between June 1897 and August 1903.

== Military and political career ==
He enrolled with the Dumfries, Roxburgh, Kirkcudbright and Selkirk (Scottish Borderers) Militia in May 1873. He joined the regular army as a lieutenant in the 82nd Regiment in 1874. He was promoted to captain in 1884 and in 1888, he was transferred to the 40th, later South Lancashire Regiment. His final promotion came in 1894 to the rank of major.

In March 1894, he succeeded Colonel Patrick Boyle, the son of the Earl of Glasgow, as private secretary and ADC to the Governor in New Zealand. He retired on 25 January 1899.

== Later life ==
In 1892, Elliot became the 6th Laird of Wolfelee on the death of his brother, James. He was made a Justice of the Peace for Roxburgh.

During the Boer War, he was a commandant of Prisoners of War. Returning to England, he was a Fellow of the Royal Colonial Institute.

Elliot went back to New Zealand in 1907, when he visited the cadet camp at Hagley Park, Christchurch during the International Exhibition. He praised the discipline and appearance of the cadets.

In 1912, he sold the family home "Wolfelee House" at Bonchester Bridge, Roxburghshire. He died on 5 December 1920; at the time of his death, he was resident at "Springfield", Breinton, Herefordshire.

== Family ==
On 27 September 1905, Elliot married Edith Margaret Crawford, the daughter of the Rev. John Charles Crawford of Coulsdon, Surrey; they had no children.
