= Sir David Hunter-Blair, 3rd Baronet =

Scottish plantation owner in Jamaica

Sir David Hunter-Blair, 3rd Baronet (1778–1857) was a Scottish plantation owner in Jamaica. He also held the office of King's Printer in Scotland.

== Life ==
The second son of Sir James Hunter-Blair, 1st Baronet (1741–1787), he succeeded his unmarried brother Sir John Hunter-Blair, 2nd Baronet on his death in 1800. He served as a midshipman of the Royal Navy on HMS Hyacinth, and then joined the 93rd Highlanders, He inherited a share of the Rozelle estate in Jamaica from his uncle Col. William Hunter of Mainholm and Brownhill. He made a successful compensation claim of the 1830s for enslaved people on it.

Sir David Hunter Blair's Reel is a traditional dance tune, first published around 1800.

== Blairquhan Castle ==
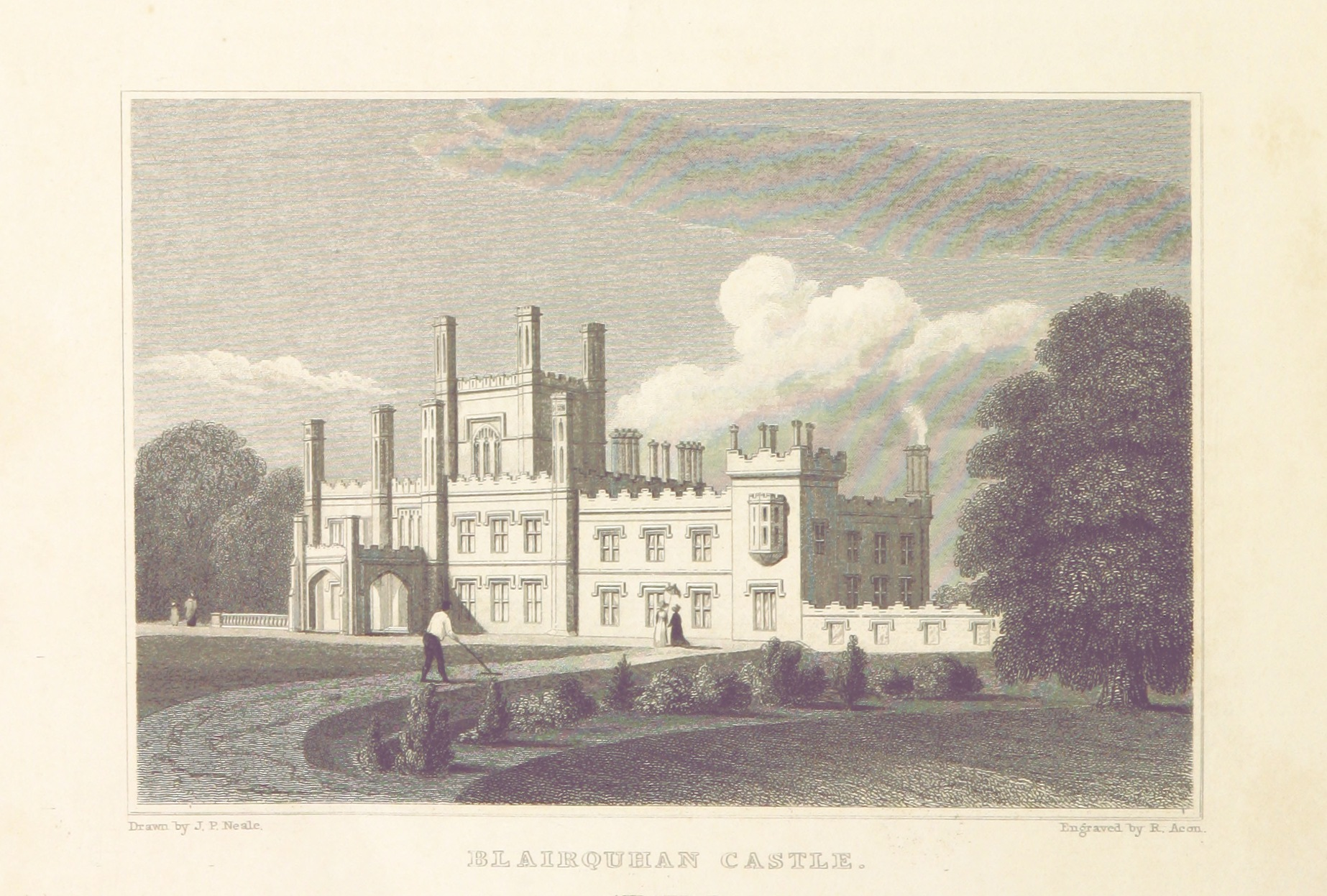
Blairquhan Castle, 1829 engraving

Hunter-Blair bought in 1798 Blairquhan Castle, Ayrshire, through his trustees (being still a minor). It was purchased from Sir John Whitefoord, 3rd Baronet, and was on the market as a long-term result of the collapse of Douglas, Heron & Company.

Sir John Whitefoord was a patron of Robert Burns, who wrote a poem about one of Whitefoord's daughters. Hunter-Blair's father had befriended Burns in 1787. Hunter-Blair himself attended the 1814 meeting at Alloway, also in Ayrshire, to the north of it in the direction of Ayr, that resulted in the Burns memorial at Alloway, near Burns Cottage.

Hunter-Blair diverted the river, and from 1803 to 1814 made extensive plantings of trees on the estate. Plans then commissioned from the architects James Gillespie Graham and Robert Wallace (died 1874) for the castle were not carried out. The gardens were designed (1816) by John Tweedie (1775–1862). Hunter-Blair in 1821–1824 had the place rebuilt by William Burn, in a Tudor Gothic style.

== King's Printer for Scotland and the Bible monopoly ==
A patent of monopoly as King's Printer for Scotland, granted earlier, became active in 1798, for 41 years. Sir David Hunter-Blair, when he became 3rd baronet, had a share in it. In the 1820s and 1830s, this position of King's Printer for Scotland that Hunter-Blair inherited from his brother came under scrutiny. It was lucrative, and the campaign against it was based mainly on the idea that ordinary or household Bibles (in the Authorised Version), should be cheaper. The monopoly in fact did not apply to annotated or illustrated Bibles.

=== Background ===
The original government grant was from 1785 but postdated, so that it ran from 1798, when the existing patent of monopoly expired, the monopoly of printing Bibles in Scotland going with the position as King's Printer. This grant was political patronage given by Henry Dundas to James Hunter Blair, who became the 1st Baronet in 1786 and died in 1787. Dundas was a Tory political manager, holding sway in Scotland. James Hunter Blair's death meant that the monopoly would pass to the next generation. Either by initial design or as an afterthought, the grant was jointly with John Bruce, tutor to Dundas's son, from 1811 Robert Dundas, 2nd Viscount Melville.

Mark & Charles Kerr were the holders to 1798 of the Scottish Bible monopoly, and printed upmarket Bibles. It came out in 1837 evidence that Adam Black had bought at least 4,000 of their Bibles in folio, and they were not quick sellers. Hunter-Blair and Bruce, successors (after the 2nd baronet died) to the Kerrs, produced 18 Bible editions over the years 1802 to 1817; and sold them also in England.

=== 1820s ===
In 1823 Hunter-Blair successfully brought a legal case to prevent the import of Bibles from England into Scotland. One of the principal opponents was John Lee, who in 1824 published Memorial for the Bible Societies in Scotland. In his Additional Memorial of 1826 Lee stated that the legal costs of the defence of the Scottish monopoly were being borne by the holders of the English Bible monopoly; and that the latter would be the major beneficiaries of the restriction of trade.

John Bruce died in 1826, unmarried; his residual estate went to his niece Margaret Stuart Bruce (died 1869). She was the daughter of his brother Robert Bruce of the Bengal Artillery and an Indian woman. She married in 1828 Onesiphorus Tyndall, and the couple used the surname Tyndall-Bruce.

=== 1830s ===
The situation south of the border changed, where Andrew Spottiswoode and his brother Robert (died 1832) took over the monopoly from their uncle Andrew Strahan on his death in 1831, and the printing company became Eyre & Spottiswoode.

A committee of the British House of Commons looked into the monopoly, from 1831. Hunter-Blair defended the cost structure under the Bible monopoly for Scotland to the committee in 1832, with the printer William Waddell. The report was inconclusive.

A second committee was set up, chaired by John Archibald Murray, the Lord Advocate, in 1835. Its remit was restricted to the Scottish monopoly. There were hearings in 1837. William Ellis, a solicitor of the Scottish Supreme Court, gave evidence on behalf of the Edinburgh Bible Society, relating to their Bible imports in 1821 and Scottish feeling. Joseph Parker (died 1850), associated as a wholesale distributor to the Clarendon Press's Bible trade under the English monopoly, testified that two-thirds of the business was with Bible societies. Adam Thomson of Coldstream gave evidence, and ran a wide-reaching campaign, against renewal of the patent. It was ultimately successful, and the patent was allowed to lapse. From 1839, therefore, the legal position for Bibles in Scotland was reversed, with imports allowed, and the monopoly for printing them removed.

== Family ==
Hunter-Blair married twice. In 1813, he married firstly Dorothea Hay-Mackenzie (died 1820), daughter of Edward Hay-Mackenzie, and niece of George Hay, 7th Marquess of Tweeddale. They had two sons and a daughter. The children of this marriage were:

- James Hunter-Blair, Member of Parliament for Ayrshire, died 1854 at the Battle of Inkerman.
- Sir Edward Hunter-Blair, 4th Baronet (1818–1896)
- Maria Dorothea, married 1838 Walter Elliott. Their children included Edward Hay Mackenzie Elliot.

In 1825, he married, secondly, Elizabeth Hay, daughter of Sir John Hay, 5th Baronet, of Smithfield and Haystoun. They had four sons and two daughters.

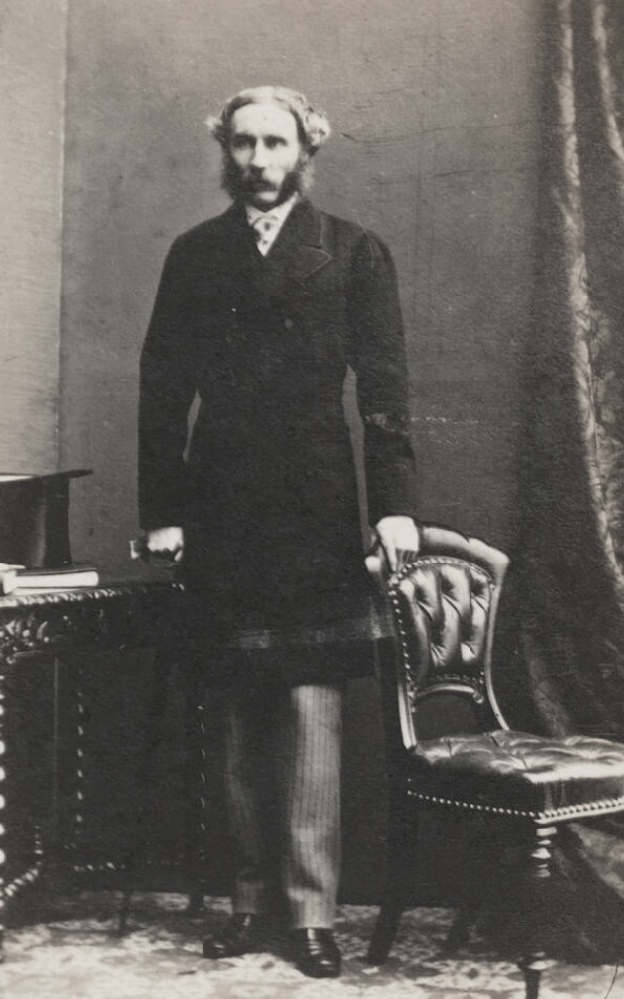
John Hunter Blair (1825–1885), eldest son of Sir David Hunter-Blair and his second wife Elizabeth Hay

- John Hunter-Blair (born 1825), Madras Civil Service, married 1852 Emily Williams Grant, daughter of Edward Grant.
- David Hunter-Blair of the Scots Guards (1827–1869), unmarried.
- William Hunter-Blair (1828–1855) of the Royal Horse Artillery.
- Henry Arthur Hunter-Blair (born 1833).
- Mary Elizabeth (died 1870), married 1852 Robert Vans-Agnew.
- Jane Anne Eliza, married 1862 Philip Lutley Sclater.
