= Blairquhan Castle =

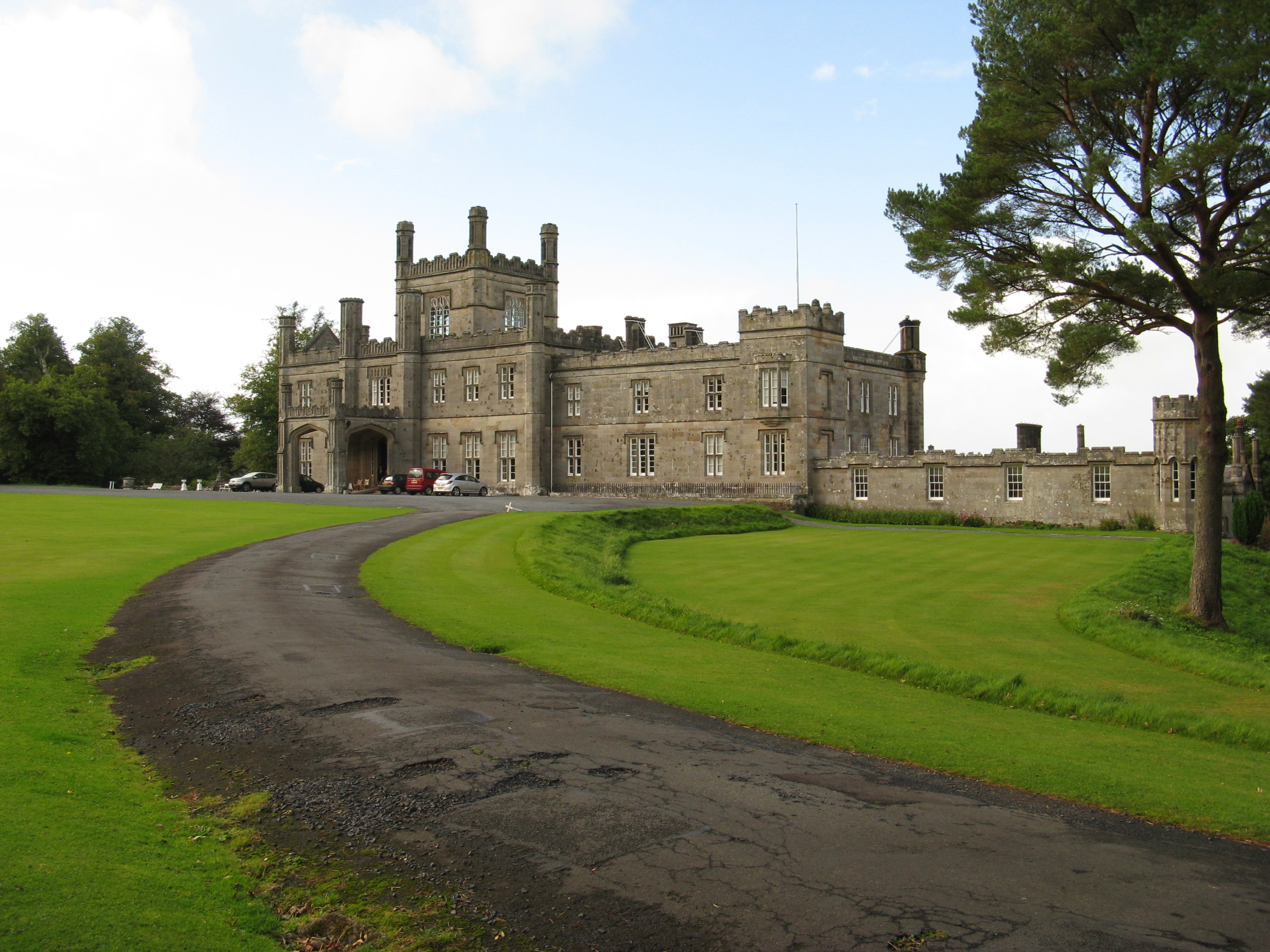
- Entrance front of Blairquhan Castle

- Location within South Ayrshire
- 55.3161°N 4.5776°W
- Location: Straiton, South Ayrshire, Scotland grid reference NS 36531 05468

History
- Built: 1824
- Built for: Hunter-Blair family

Site notes
- Architect: William Burn
- Architectural style: Tudor revival

Listed Building – Category A
- Designated: 14 April 1971
- Reference no.: LB19094

Inventory of Gardens and Designed Landscapes in Scotland
- Official name: Blairquhan
- Criteria: Historical; Horticultural; Architectural
- Designated: 1 July 1987
- Reference no.: GDL00063

Blairquhan (/blɛərˈhwɑːn/ blair-WHAHN, Scots: Blairwhan) is a Regency era castle near Maybole in South Ayrshire, Scotland. It was the historic home of the Hunter-Blair Baronets and remained in the family's possession until 2012, when it was sold to the bottled water company Ganten.

Blairquhan is protected as a Category A listed building, and the grounds are included in the Inventory of Gardens and Designed Landscapes in Scotland, the national listing of significant gardens.

== History ==
Four different families have lived at Blairquhan or on its lands. The McWhirters built the first tower house in about 1346. The Kennedys then inherited the estate through marriage and built the remainder of the old castle in about 1573. In the early 17th century the Whitefords took over, but in 1798, suffering the effects of a bank crash, they sold Blairquhan to Sir David Hunter Blair, 3rd Baronet, the second son of Sir James Hunter Blair, 1st Baronet who had married Jean Blair, the daughter and heiress of John Blair of Dunskey in Wigtownshire in 1770. When Jean Blair inherited her father's estate in 1777, the family adopted the additional surname of Blair. Sir David Hunter Blair made some of his money in Jamaica and was joint-owner of Roselle Estate, St Thomas-in-the-East.

In 1820, Sir David commissioned Scottish architect William Burn to design a new house on Blairquhan. The old castle, which had become ruinous due to previous fires and neglect, was torn down for a new, Tudor-style castle, which nevertheless incorporated some of the decorative mouldings and sculpted stones from the old castle into its kitchen courtyard. The new mansion was completed in 1824, and contains many antiques and an important collection of paintings by Scottish artists. In late 2012, Sir Patrick David Hunter-Blair, 9th Baronet, sold Blairquhan to Ganten Scotland, a subsidiary of a Chinese company which bottles mineral water for distribution around the world.

== The estate and grounds ==
Blairquhan is approached from the north via a three-mile (five-kilometre) drive along the River Girvan. The late James Hunter Blair (1926–2004), younger brother and heir presumptive of Sir Edward Hunter-Blair, 8th Baronet (1920–2006), was a noted horticulturalist and forester who spent most of his life restoring the castle and preserving the estate grounds, which include veteran trees and a walled garden. An ancient sycamore which stands in the shadow of the castle is thought to be a Dule Tree or gallows tree, planted early in the 16th century during the reign of King James V of Scotland. The once-spreading crown was heavily pruned in 1997, saving the much-weakened trunk from total collapse.

== As a tourist attraction ==
To help offset operating costs, James Hunter Blair opened the 2,000-acre (800-hectare) estate as a venue for private functions such as weddings, corporate outings and filming. The current owners continue this operation, offering the castle as an exclusive use venue. Blairquhan was seen in the UK television programme Beauty and the Geek. Its interiors and grounds were also used as a substitute location for Balmoral Castle in the Oscar-winning 2006 film The Queen, starring Helen Mirren.
