= Alexander Haldane Oswald =

Scottish Conservative Party politician

Member of Parliament for Ayrshire
- In office 8 August 1843 – 7 July 1852
- Preceded by: Viscount Kelburn
- Succeeded by: James Hunter Blair

Personal details
- Born: 12 December 1811 Govan, Scotland
- Died: 6 September 1868 (aged 56) Auchincruive, Ayrshire, Scotland
- Party: Conservative
- Parents: Richard Alexander Oswald (father); Elizabeth Anderson (mother)

Alexander Haldane Oswald (12 December 1811 – 6 September 1868) was a Scottish Conservative Party politician. He was the member of parliament (MP) for Ayrshire from 1843 to 1852.

== Early life ==
Alexander Oswald was born in Govan, Scotland to Richard Alexander Oswald, merchant of Moore Park, Glasgow and Elizabeth Anderson, the eldest of five children. He represented the family of Haldane of that Ilk through Agnes Haldane (his paternal great-grandmother) who was the mother of Mrs. Alexander Oswald (Margaret Dundas) of Shield Hall. Having proved his representation and received Arms and Supporters accordingly, he adopted the middle name of Haldane.

== Career ==
Oswald was a Conservative candidate and sworn as a member of parliament for Ayrshire on 8 August 1843.

He remained as an M.P. until 7 July 1852.

On 18 June 1845, he appeared at Marylebone Magistrates Court having allegedly assaulted a police officer while "much the worse for drink". He was found guilty and fined £3 which he immediately paid.

He was re-elected, unopposed on 5 August 1847.

His first recorded debate in the House of Commons was on 24 July 1846 (Ways and Means – Sugar Duties – Adjourned) and his final recorded debate was on 25 June 1852 (Corrupt Practices at Elections Bill). During his time as an M.P. he had a total of 39 recorded contributions.

Oswald died on 6 September 1868 at the family estate in Auchincruive, Ayrshire.

== Family life ==
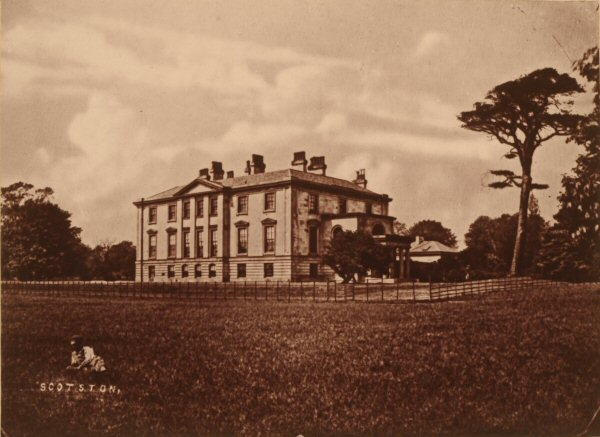
"Scotstoun" – another country house that Oswald inherited from his uncle.

On 15 August 1844 at St. Helen's, Isle of Wight, Hampshire, Oswald married Lady Louisa Elizabeth Frederica (daughter of the 1st Earl of Craven), widow of Sir Frederick George Johnstone, 7th Baronet, (son of Sir John Lowther Johnstone, 6th Baronet), and mother of Sir Frederick Johnstone, 8th Baronet and George Charles Keppel Johnstone. Together Alexander and Louisa had two daughters and two sons. Their daughter Edith Mary married John Yorke, 7th Earl of Hardwicke.

Oswald succeeded to the Oswald family estate in Auchincruive when his paternal uncle James Oswald died in 1853. Before this, he had been living with his wife and young family in Eaton Place, London. By 1861, he was widowed and living with his three teenage children in Green Street, Westminster.

Parliament of the United Kingdom
Preceded by Viscount Kelburn	Member of Parliament for Ayrshire; 1843 – 1852	Succeeded by James Hunter Blair
