= Sir Adam Fergusson, 3rd Baronet =

Scottish advocate and politician

Sir Adam Fergusson, 3rd Baronet of Kilkerran, FRSE LLD (7 May 1733 – 25 September 1813) was a Scottish advocate, politician and slave-owner. He was described as able but humourless. Together with contemporaries such as Robert Dundas he was part of what was called the Scotch Ministry in parliament in the late 18th century. He was joint owner, with his brothers and members of the Hunter-Blair family, of plantations in Tobago and Jamaica and of several hundred enslaved African people.

Dr Samuel Johnson described him as "a vile Whig" however his friend James Boswell was less condemning, saying "few people were but mixed character, like a candle: half wax, half tallow- but Sir Adam Fergusson was all wax, with a pure taper, whom you may light and set upon any lady’s table". Robert Burns who knew Fergusson through his Ayr connections, called him "the oath-detesting, chaste, Kilkerran". Boswell described him as "his excellent friend".

== Life ==
He was born in Ayrshire on 7 May 1733, the oldest surviving son of Lady Jean Maitland, daughter of Viscount Maitland, and Sir James Fergusson, 2nd Baronet. His younger brother was George Fergusson.

He attended Maybole School before studying law at the University of Edinburgh, qualifying as an advocate in 1755. He then spent a year in Brussels doing further legal studies before undertaking a Grand Tour of Europe as was the fashion of the day, 1757-58.

In 1759, his father died and he inherited his estates and baronetcy. At this point, he and his friend George Dempster of Dunnichen both decided to go into politics. Fergusson stood for the Ayr Burghs against Patrick Craufurd. His youth (26 years old) did not stand him in good stead, and he was forced to withdraw 10 days before the election, much to his embarrassment. This experience jaded him against politics for a few years.

As an advocate he won fame in pursuing the young Countess of Sutherland’s claims to the peerage. In 1774 he re-entered politics with a somewhat ironic slogan of being "a champion of the county against aristocratic influence" (referring to more senior members of the aristocracy rather than himself). In this venture he was backed by the Lord President, Robert Dundas and his brother Henry. They provided a fall-back position of standing for the Linlithgow Burghs should he not win Ayrshire but this proved unnecessary as he won the Ayrshire seat.

His first recorded speech in Parliament was on 26 October 1775 when he spoke out advocating strong measures be taken against the United States of America. On 24 November 1775, he seemed to sway in the other direction, insisting that the government consult parliament before sending Hanoverian troops to either Gibraltar or Menorca. His interests focussed upon topics such as the Scottish Militia and subjects such as the bill to curtail adultery in 1779. In 1779 he also spoke against Henry Cavendish in his proposal to remove troops from America to concentrate on the wars with France.

He was re-elected on petition for Ayrshire in 1781, winning against the peers’ choice of Hugh Montgomerie. In this second session he was more trusted and selected for a secret committee to investigate the cause of the wars in the Carnatic region of southern India. In July he was given an important place on the Board of Trade. He was a strong but silent supporter of Lord North. In further years he spoke against the turnpike taxes in their impact upon Scotland, and the curious bills prohibiting the growth of tobacco in Britain, and taxing soap. He later supported Pitt, but criticised delays in the passing of the Mutiny Bill. In 1796 he voted in Parliament against the abolition of the slave trade.

Fergusson was a partner of the disastrous bank Douglas, Heron & Company.

In 1783 he was a founding member of the Royal Society of Edinburgh and in 1786 founded the British Fishery Society.

At the next election in August 1784, by agreement with Dundas and others, he stood down in Ayrshire to allow Hugh Montgomerie success, and instead was offered James Hunter Blair’s seat in Edinburgh. However, he received no office in this new role. He voted for Parliamentary Reform in 1785. His period as an Edinburgh MP was relatively silent.

In 1790 he returned as an MP for Ayrshire. In 1791, Pitt suggested him as Surveyor of Crown Lands to the King but this was not accepted. His health was failing and he spoke little. He did not seek re-election in 1796.

In 1796 he unsuccessfully claimed the title of Earl of Glencairn (through his mother’s lineage). He spent his final years as an advocate.

He died on 25 September 1813. He never married.

Baronetage of Nova Scotia
Preceded by James Fergusson	Baronet (of Kilkerran); 1759–1813	Succeeded by James Fergusson
