= Walter Elliot (naturalist) =

Scottish civil servant and naturalist

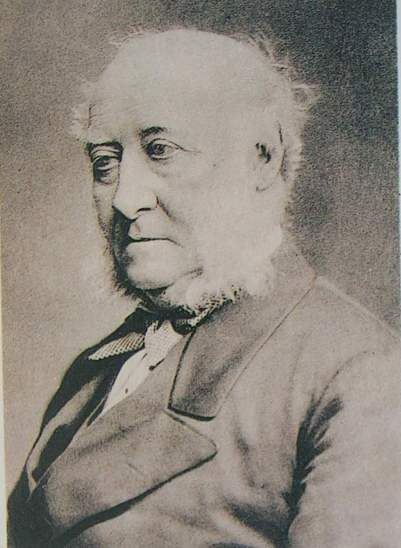
Sir Walter Elliot.

Sir Walter Elliot, KCSI (16 January 1803 – 1 March 1887) was a British civil servant in colonial India. He was also an eminent orientalist, linguist, archaeologist, naturalist and ethnologist who worked mainly in the Presidency of Madras. Born in Edinburgh, he studied at the East India Company College at Haileybury and joined the East India Company's civil service at Madras in 1820 and worked on until 1860. He was invested Knight Commander of the Order of the Star of India (KCSI) in 1866.

== Early life ==
Elliot was born in 1803 at Edinburgh, son of James Elliot of Wolfelee and Caroline (née Hunter). His early education was under a private tutor and he later was at school near Doncaster. He then went to Haileybury College, with a recommendation from his aunt, the widow of the 12th Lord Elphinstone, graduated with "high distinction", and in January 1819 took up an appointment in the East India Company's Civil Service as a "writer". The post was secured through the influence of his great-uncle William Fullerton Elphinstone, the company's director. He landed in Madras, India on 14 June 1820.

== India ==
Elliot's training continued at the college at Fort St George in Madras, where he excelled in languages, winning an award of 1000 pagodas for his proficiency in Tamil and Hindustani. He later learned other languages: Kannada, Marathi, Arabic, Persian and Telugu. For two years he worked as an assistant to the collector of Salem district. He then arranged with Sir Thomas Munro and Mountstuart Elphinstone to be transferred into the newly acquired territory of southern Maratha district.

In 1824 Elliot was caught up in the Kittur insurrection, which tried to take over a territory then under the control of Kittur Chennamma. He was taken prisoner, while his superior, St John Thackeray, the political agent of Dharwar (and uncle of William Makepeace Thackeray), was killed. Elliot and an assistant Stevenson were held in imprisonment for six weeks. They received good treatment from their captors, and it was during this period that he learnt about Hindu ideas of kinship, caste and custom. The southern Maratha district was subsequently moved from the control of the Madras to the Bombay Presidency but he was allowed to stay on by the governor of Bombay, Sir John Malcolm. During this period he gained a reputation as an adventurer, historian, big-game hunter and linguist.

== Period in England ==
Elliot left for England on 11 December 1833 accompanied by Robert Pringle of the Bombay civil service. They sailed through the Red Sea and rode across the desert from Al-Qusayr to Thebes; and then sailed down the Nile to Cairo before visiting Constantinople, Athens, Corfu and Rome. They reached England on 5 May 1835.

In 1836 Elliot's cousin John Elphinstone, 13th Lord Elphinstone was appointed Governor of the Madras Presidency. Elliott took up a post as his private secretary, and the two sailed together on a yacht, the Prince Regent which was gifted to them by the imam of Muscat. They arrived in Madras in February 1837.

== Return to India ==
Elliot worked with Elphinstone until the latter's retirement in September 1842. Elphinstone's successor, George Hay, 8th Marquess of Tweeddale, found Elliot working in a whole range of capacities, and well beyond his position as a private secretary. He held also a position as a translator (of Canarese) to the Government. Elliot was then employed in the board of revenue. In 1845 he was appointed to examine Guntur district which had been hit by the major famine of 1833 and had not shown signs of recovery. Elliot found deep-seated corruption and collusion between village elites, local revenue officials, and five zamindar families that held most of the land in the district. The East India Company's court of directors were impressed by his work and appointed him commissioner of the Northern Circars, a position of responsibility that he managed until 1854 when he became a Member of the Council of the Governor of Madras. During 1858, Elliot temporarily replaced George Harris, 3rd Baron Harris and Governor of the Madras Presidency as the provisional governor; it fell to him to announce that following the Indian Rebellion of 1857, the Honourable East India Company's responsibilities would be transferred to The Crown, beginning the British Raj.

Towards the end of his life Elliott began to lose his sight and in his later years was completely blind. He retired from service in 1859.

== Research ==
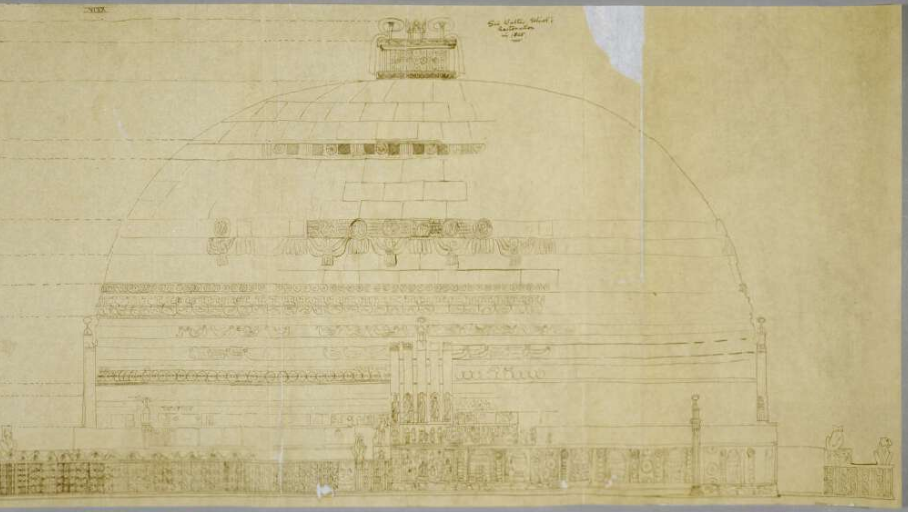
Reconstruction of the Amaravati Stupa, by or after Sir Walter Elliott, 1845.

While in India Elliot maintained a diary with notes on a range of subjects. He also wrote to the journals of scholarly societies. In 1859 he published Flora Andhrica, or plants of the Northern Circars which included the names of plants in Telugu and English. In 1840 he wrote on the 'cromlechs and cairns' in the Nilgiri hills.

In 1845 he excavated and collected important sculptures from the Amaravati Stupa, which at the time were sometimes called the "Elliot Marbles". They went to Madras, and later a (relatively inferior) part of them went to London, where they are now the Amaravati Marbles in the British Museum. The major portion is in the Government Museum, Chennai.

Elliot studied ancient inscriptions, beliefs and cultures. He was a keen numismatist and collector of coins and his main work on the topic was published in 1885, at a time when unable to see, he had to feel the coins to describe them and have written by a scribe for his Coins of Southern India.

He oversaw the production of 'Carnataca Translation of Esop's Fables'.

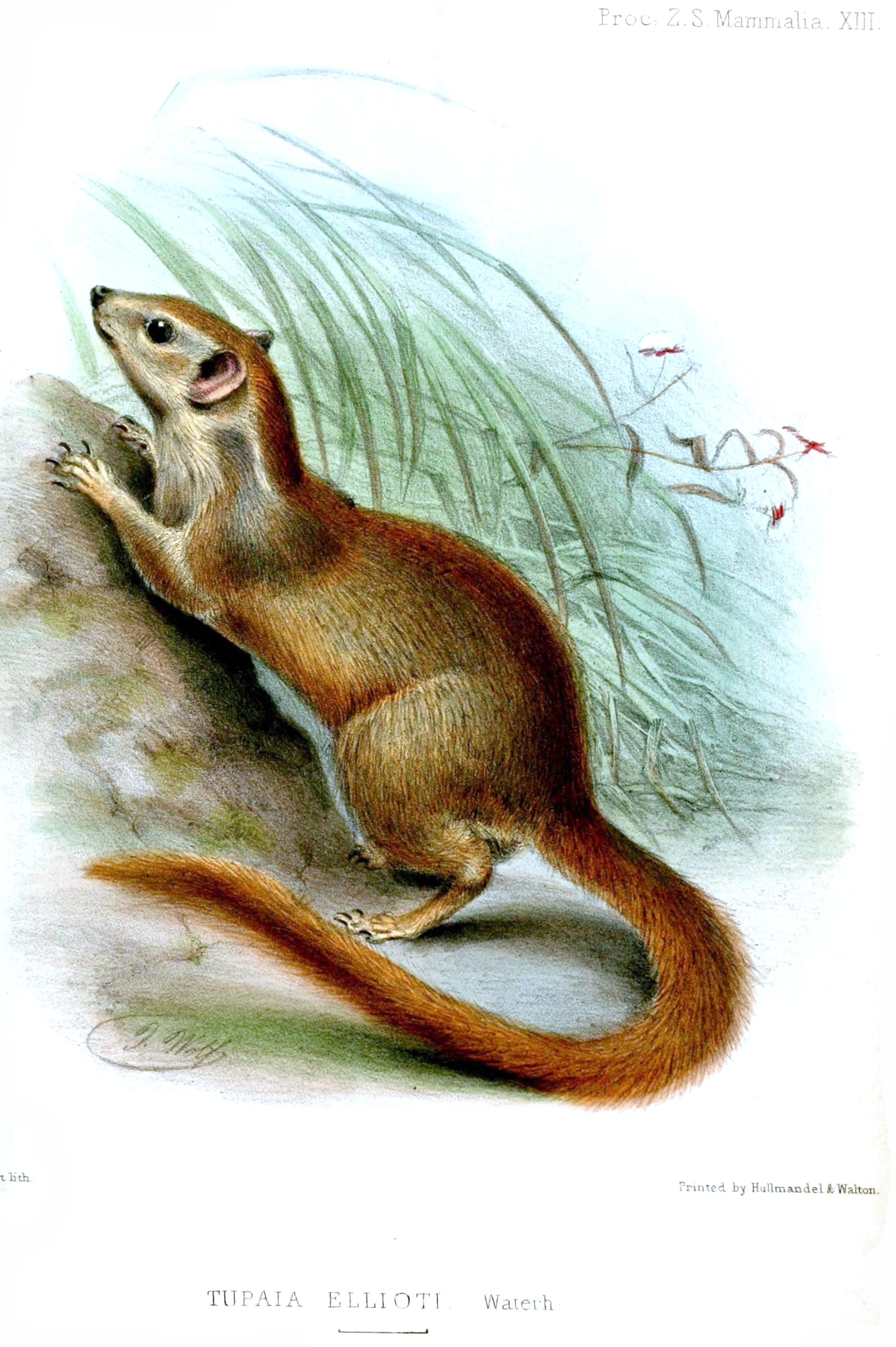
Anathana ellioti named after Elliot by George Robert Waterhouse, the genus name is derived from Tamil.

He took an interest in the local zoology and spent considerable time outdoors in his early years in India. He was in correspondence with Charles Darwin and at his request he sent him skins of various domestic birds from India and Burma in 1856. He also collaborated with naturalists in India like Thomas C. Jerdon. He collected specimens of molluscs, beached whales and dolphins and a range of other species which were examined by experts in Britain like Richard Owen. He catalogued the mammals of southern India in the Madras Journal of Literature and Science and described several new species of small mammals. The rat species Golunda ellioti and the Madras tree-shrew Anathana ellioti are named after him. W. T. Blanford wrote to him "[V]ery little work is now done on mammals in India. Everybody has gone into ornithology. So far as I am aware your paper in the Madras journal is the only good account ..." Two species of Indian reptiles are named after him: Monilesaurus ellioti and Uropeltis ellioti.

Elliot's home in Randals Road, Vepery, Madras was a focal point for scholars in the region. He encouraged many other oriental researchers including Ferdinand Kittel and Robert Caldwell. Back in Scotland, his family home became a veritable museum, and he was active until the day of his death. On 1 March 1887 he dictated and signed a letter to George Pope, expressing his enthusiasm for a new edition of Pope's translation of the Tamil Kural. He died the same evening.

== Retirement in Scotland ==
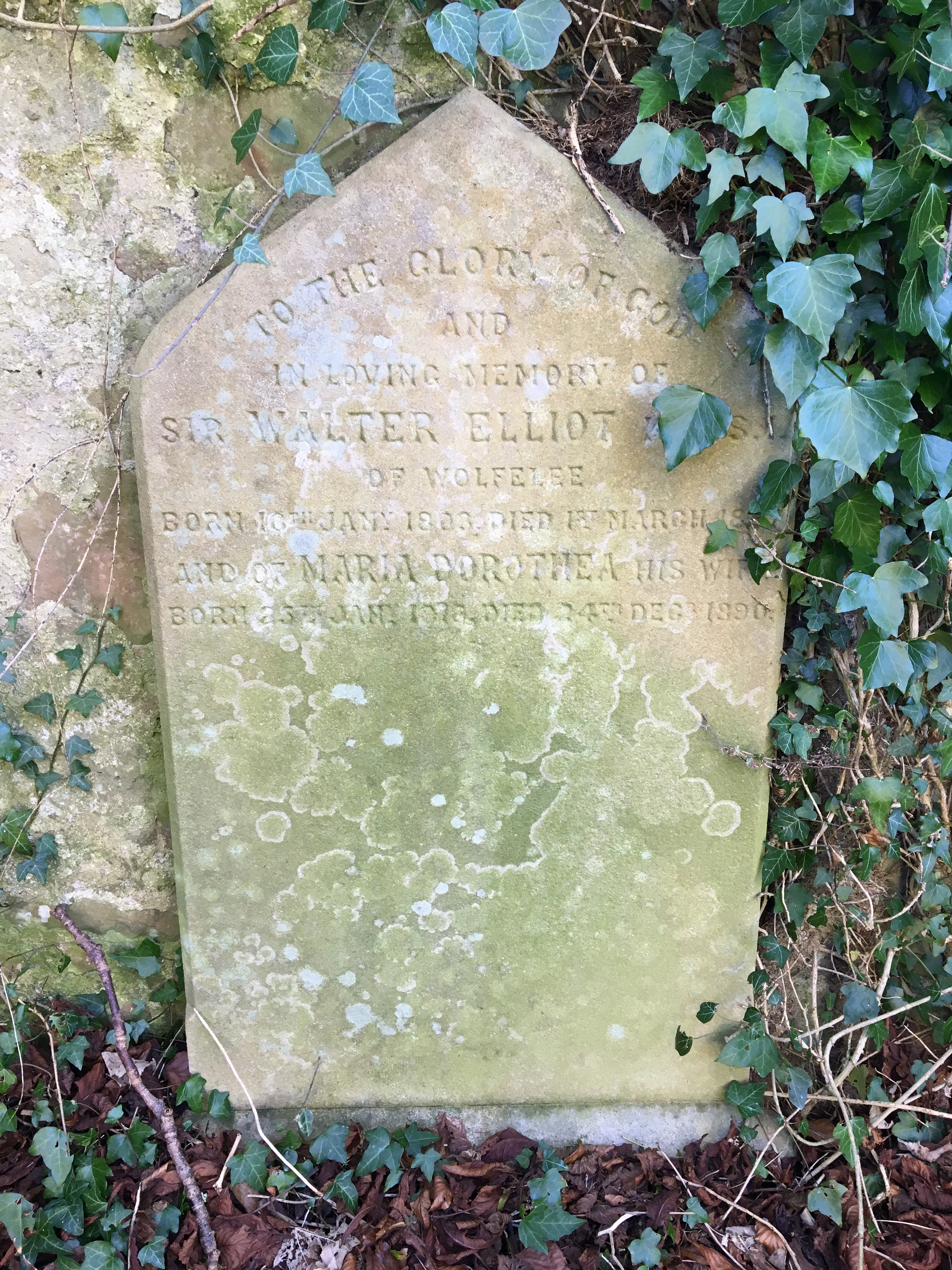
Sir Walter and Maria Dorothea Elliot's grave in Chesters Church

Elliot returned to Wolfelee in Roxburghshire in 1860, where he continued his researches. In 1866 he was made Knight Commander of the Star of India. In 1878 he was elected a Fellow of the Royal Society. He was awarded LL.D. of the University of Edinburgh in 1879. In 1874 he contributed an obituary of Thomas C. Jerdon to the journal Nature which was however not published for want of space. In his county, he continued to serve as deputy lieutenant and a magistrate.

A memorial tablet was erected in the Parish Church of Hobkirk with an epitaph by Colonel Henry Yule.

== Family ==
On 15 January 1839, he married Maria Dorothea Hunter Blair (c.1816–1890), daughter of Sir David Hunter-Blair, 3rd Baronet, in Malta. They had four sons and two daughters: The ornithologist Philip Lutley Sclater was married to a sister of Maria Dorothea.

- James Thomas Spencer Elliot (1845–1892)
- Walter Blair Elliot (1847–1869)
- Caroline Elliot (1852–post 1887)
- Edward (1852–1920), who played football for Scotland in the unofficial international matches in 1871 and 1872.
- Herman Elliot (1854–1895)
- Dorothea Helen Elliot (died 1925)

== Writings ==
Elliot was the author of :

- Hindu Inscriptions being an outline of the Hindu Dynasties of S India from 4th to 12th Centuries deduced from Inscriptions collected in the Dekhan. J. Roy. As. Soc. 18
- Account of the Poma sodomitica, or Dead Sea Apples [1835], Entom. Soc. Trans., ii. 1837–40, pp. 14–17.
- A Catalogue of the Species of Mammalia found in the Southern Mahratta Country, with their synonyms in the native languages in use there, Madras Jour., x., 1839, pp. 92–108,207–233.
- Description of a new Species of Naja, or Cobra di Capello, Madras Jour., x., 1840, pp. 39–41.
- Note on the Species of Naja (N. vittata), described; page 39, Madras Jour., xi., 1840, pp. 390–393.
- Carnataca Translation Of Esop's Fables 1840.
- Catalogue of the Mammalia found in the Southern Mahratta Country. Madras Journ Lit & Sc x 1839
- Numismatic Gleanings, being a description of the most ancient coinage of Southern India. Mad Journ, vols xix & xx
- Flora Andhrica an identification of the Vernacular names of Plants in the Telugu Districts. Madras, 1858-9
- On the Characteristics of the population of Central & Southern India. Journ Ethn Soc new series, vol i 1869
- Ancient Sepulchral Remains of S India particularly those of the Nilagiri Mountains. Rep of the International Congress of Prehistoric Archaeology, 1865.
- On Bos Gaurus, Jour. Asiatic Soc., x., 1841, pp. 579–580.
- Description of a new Species of Terrestrial Planria (P. lunata), Madras Jour., xv., 1848, pp. 162–167.
- On the Farinaceous Grains and the various Kinds of Pulse used in Southern India, Edin. New Phil. Jour., xvi., 1862, pp. 1–25; Edin. Bot. Soc. Trans., vii., 1863, pp. 276–300.
- On Euphysetes simus, Ann. May. Nat. Hist., xix., 1867, pp. 372,373.
- On the Habits of the Indian Rock-Snake (Python molurus), Brit. Assoc. Reports, xl., 1870 (sect.), p. 115.
- Address on the Progress of Botanical Science [1870], Edin. Bot. Soc. Trans., xi., 1873, pp. 1–41.
- On a Goshawk killed at Minto, and other Raptorial Birds, Proc. Berwickshire Nat. Field Club, vol. vi.
- Rarer Birds of the Hawick District, Proc. Ber. Nat. Field Club, vol. vii.
- Some Account of the Plague of Field Mice in the Border Farms in 1876–77, with Observations on the Genus Arvicola in general, Proc. Ber. Nat. Field Club, vol. viii.
- Notes on the Indian Bustard (Eupodotis Edwardsii), Proc. Zool. Soc., 1880.
- On the Representation and Co-operation of Naturalists' Clubs, Proc. Ber. Nat. Field Club, vol. ix,
