= James Fergusson, Lord Kilkerran =

Scottish judge

Sir James Fergusson, Lord Kilkerran
- Born: 1688
- Died: 1759 (aged 70–71)

Sir James Fergusson of Kilkerran, 2nd Baronet, Lord Kilkerran (1688–1759) was a Scottish judge.

== Biography ==
Fergusson was the eldest son of Sir John Fergusson, 1st Baronet, of Kilkerran (whom he succeeded to the Fergusson Baronetcy in 1729), was born in 1688. He studied law possibly at Leyden, and was admitted advocate 1711.

Fergusson was elected as the Member of Parliament for Sutherland in 1734, and sat for that county until he was made lord of session on 7 November 1735. It was then he took the courtesy title of Lord Kilkerran. He was made Lord of Justiciary 3 April 1749. He died at his home near Edinburgh 20 January 1759.

== Works ==
Fergusson collected and digested in the form of a dictionary the Decisions of the Court of Session from the Year 1738 to the Year 1752. To these are added "a few decisions given in the years 1736 and 1737". This was published by his son George (Edinburgh, 1775). "A volume much admired for its clarity, and as a model for the most useful form of law reports".

== Assessment ==
In Tytler's Life of Lord Kames Fergusson is estimated as "undoubtedly one of the ablest lawyers of his time. His knowledge was founded on a thorough acquaintance with the Roman jurisprudence, imbibed from the best commentators of the pandects, and with the recondite learning of Craig, who has laid open the fountains of the Scottish law in all that regards the system of feudalism. … The decisions which he has recorded during the period when he sat as a judge of the supreme court exhibit the clearest comprehension and the soundest views of jurisprudence, and will for ever serve as a model for the most useful form of law reports".

== Family ==
In September 1726 Fergusson married, Jean (1703–1766) (daughter of James Maitland, Viscount Maitland (born circa 1680–1709) and Jean, daughter of John Gordon, 16th Earl of Sutherland). They had a large family, including:

- Adam FRSE LLD (1733–1813), their eldest surviving son who inherited the baronetcy, and became an advocate, MP (alternatively for both Ayrshire and Edinburgh), and Rector of Glasgow University
- Helen (1741–1810), who became the second wife of Sir David Dalrymple, Lord Hailes
- George (1743–1827), who became Lord Hermand
- John, a soldier (1730- )
- James Fergusson (1747-1777), in the spring of 1773, went to the West Indies to operate a plantation staffed with slave labour

== Notes ==
Parliament of Great Britain
Preceded by Lord Strathnaver	Member of Parliament for Sutherland; 1734–1735	Succeeded by James St Clair
Baronetage of Nova Scotia
Preceded by John Fergusson	Baronet (of Kilkerran); 1729–1759	Succeeded by Adam Fergusson
