= Straiton =

Village in South Ayrshire, Scotland

Coordinates: 55.3114°N 4.5515°W

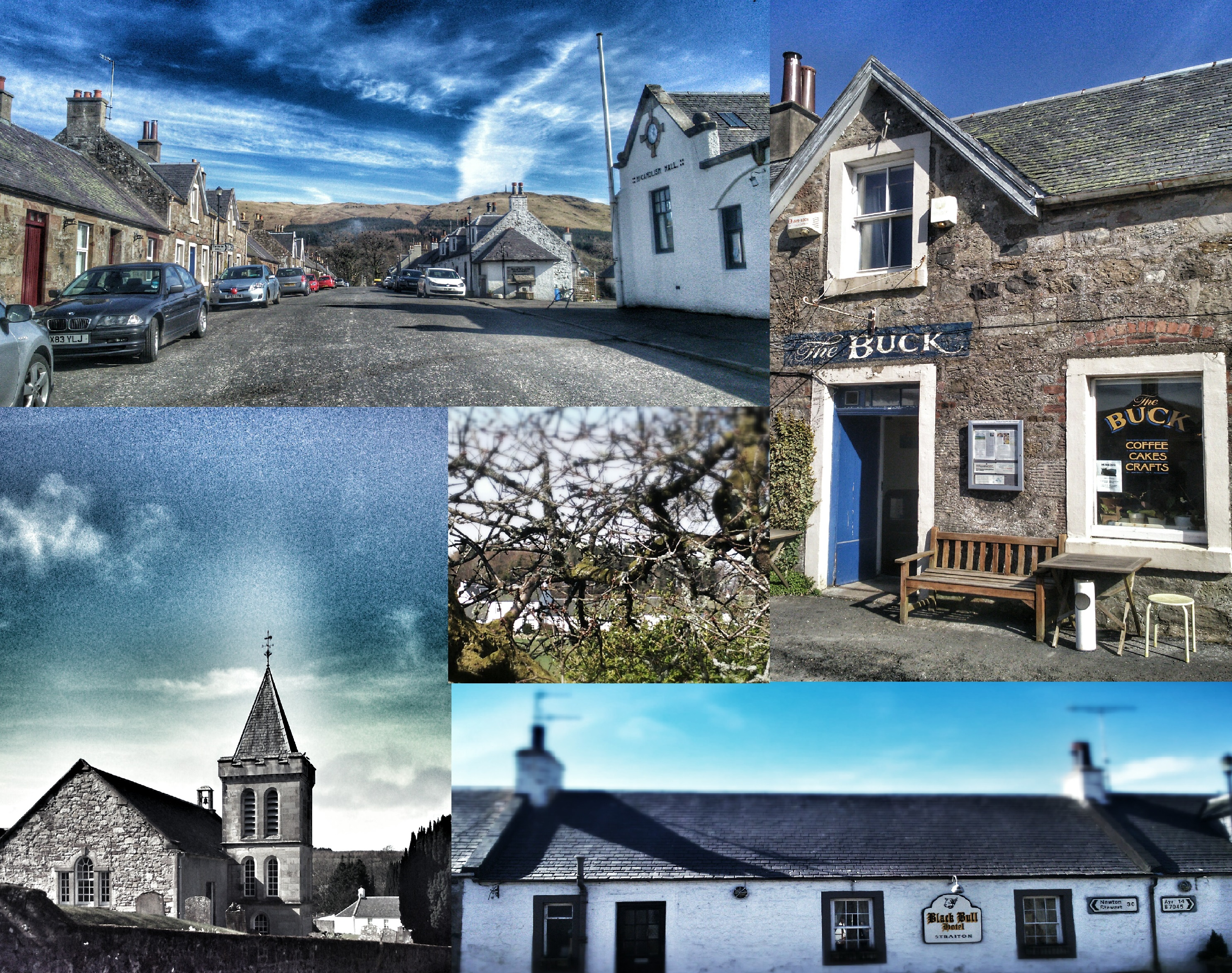
- Straiton collage

- Location within South Ayrshire
- OS grid reference: NS381048
- Council area: South Ayrshire
- Lieutenancy area: Ayrshire and Arran
- Country: Scotland
- Sovereign state: United Kingdom
- Post town: MAYBOLE
- Postcode district: KA19
- Police: Scotland
- Fire: Scottish
- Ambulance: Scottish
- UK Parliament: Ayr, Carrick and Cumnock
- Scottish Parliament: Carrick, Cumnock and Doon Valley

Straiton is a village on the River Girvan in South Ayrshire in Scotland. It lies in the hills between Kirkmichael, Dalmellington, Crosshill, and Maybole.

Straiton was mainly built in the 18th century to house mill workers and weavers working in Glasgow and Paisley. In 1846 it had 1363 inhabitants.

Straiton Parish Church was built in 1758. Traboyack House, the former manse, was built in 1759.

Local attractions include:

- Blairquhan Castle, open to visitors in spring and summer, was the historic home of the Hunter-Blair Baronets.
- Colonel Hunter Blair's Monument, a stone obelisk on Highgate Hill
- Tairlaw Linn, a local waterfall.

Straiton was the main location for the film The Match, where two rival pubs played against each other in an annual football match as a challenge. However, since the village has only one pub, a house was used as a pub for filming.

== Community public toilets ==
The village's public toilets were closed by South Ayrshire Council in 2008 and subsequently re-opened under the management of the village community. Donations are invited to cover the £3,500 annual running costs.
