= Sir James Fergusson, 6th Baronet =

British politician and colonial administrator

The Right Honourable Sir James Fergusson Bt GCSI KCMG DL
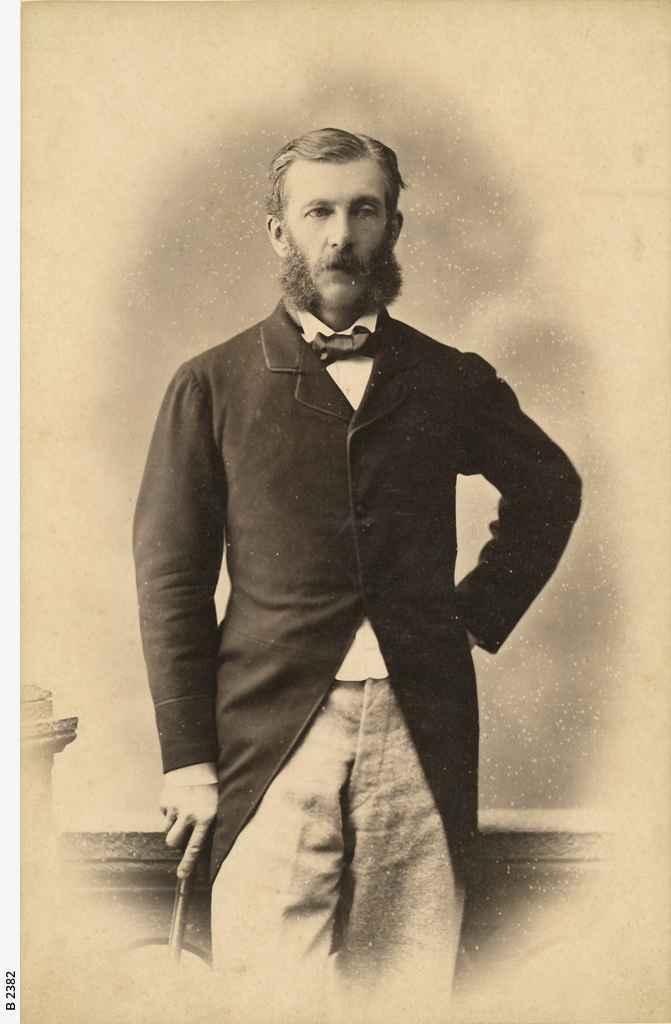

6th Governor of New Zealand
- In office 14 June 1873 – 3 December 1874
- Monarch: Victoria
- Premier: Julius Vogel
- Preceded by: George Bowen
- Succeeded by: George Phipps

8th Governor of South Australia
- In office 16 February 1869 – 18 April 1873
- Monarch: Victoria
- Preceded by: Sir Dominick Daly
- Succeeded by: Sir Anthony Musgrave

Personal details
- Born: 14 March 1832 Edinburgh, Scotland
- Died: 14 January 1907 (aged 74) Jamaica
- Party: Conservative
- Spouses: Lady Edith Broun-Ramsay (m. 1859; died 1871) Olive Richman (m. 1873; died 1882) Isabella Twysden (m. 1893)
- Children: 5, including Charles
- Education: University College, Oxford

Sir James Fergusson, 6th Baronet GCSI KCMG PC DL (14 March 1832 – 14 January 1907) was a British soldier, Conservative politician and colonial administrator who was the sixth governor of New Zealand from 1873 to 1874.

== Early life ==
Born in Edinburgh, Scotland, Fergusson was the eldest son of Sir Charles Dalrymple Fergusson, 5th Baronet (1800–1849), and his wife Helen, a daughter of David Boyle. He was educated at Cheam, Rugby, and University College, Oxford, which he left without taking a degree, to go to war. In 1851, aged nineteen, he was commissioned into the Grenadier Guards and served in the Crimean War, in which he was wounded. He resigned his commission in 1859.

== Political and administrative career ==
Fergusson was elected Member of Parliament for Ayrshire and represented the constituency in parliament from 1854 to 1857 and 1859 to 1868. He was Under-Secretary of State for India under Lord Derby from 1866 to 1867 and Under-Secretary of State for the Home Department from 1867 to 1868 under Derby and Benjamin Disraeli and was admitted to the Privy Council in 1868.

Fergusson served as Governor of South Australia from 1868. In November 1872 he was appointed governor of New Zealand and left Adelaide on 6 December for a short visit to England before taking up the post.

He was Governor of New Zealand between 1873 and 1874, when he resigned and returned to England.

He was appointed a Knight Commander of the Order of St Michael and St George in 1874.

He was appointed to a Royal Commission to inquire into the operation of the Factory and Workshop Acts in 1875, and to a Commission inquiring into the sale of liquor in Scotland in 1877.

He was Governor of Bombay between 1880 and 1885.

He was appointed an Extra Knight Grand Commander of the Order of the Star of India in 1885.

Following his retirement, he returned to the House of Commons, as Member of Parliament for Manchester North East, which he represented between 1885 and 1906. He again held political office as Under-Secretary of State for Foreign Affairs between 1886 and 1891 and as Postmaster General between 1891 and 1892 in Lord Salisbury's Conservative administration.

== Family ==
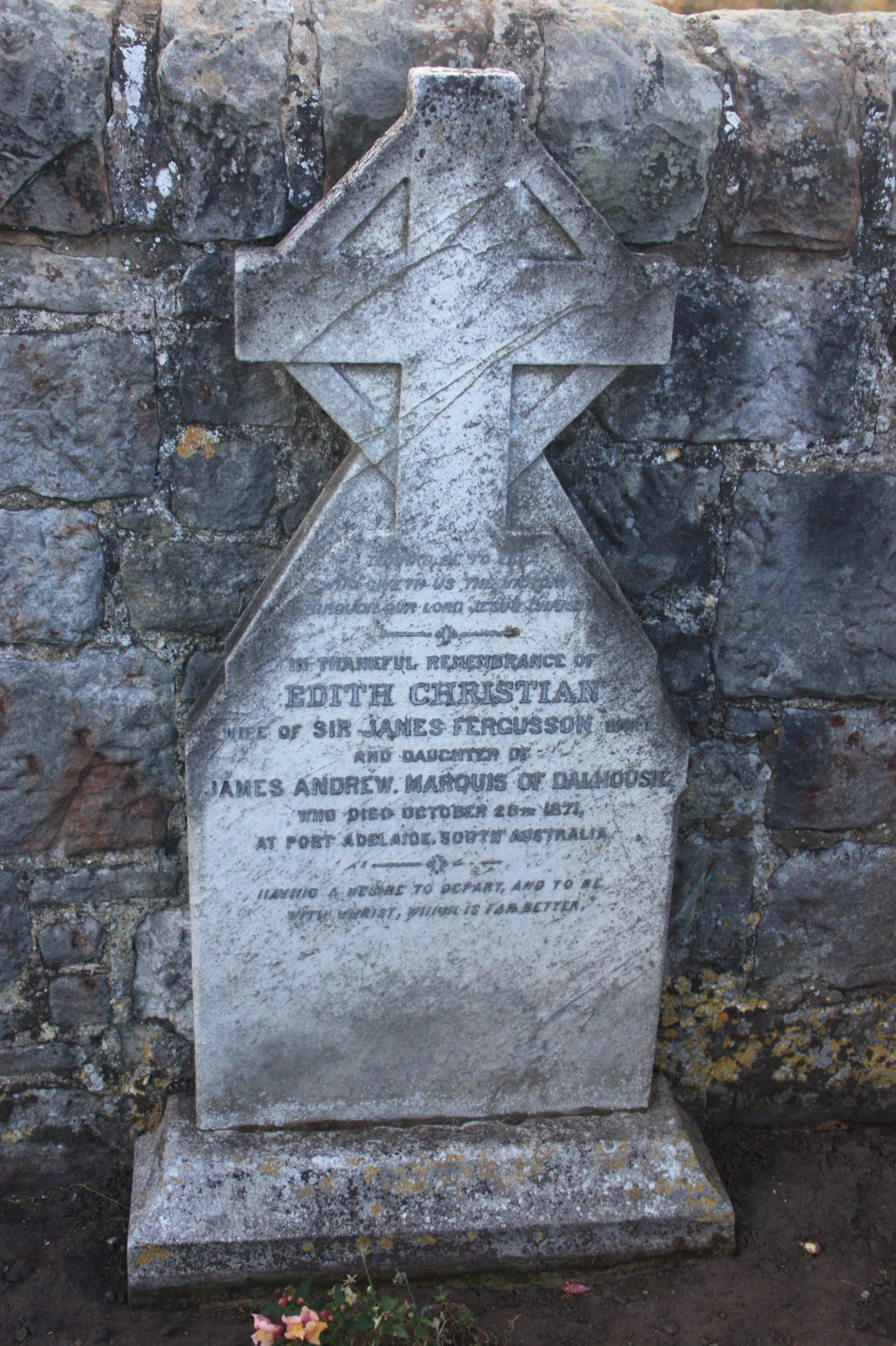
Memorial for Lady Edith Christian Fergusson, Inveresk Cemetery

Fergusson married firstly Lady Edith Christian, daughter of James Broun-Ramsay, 1st Marquess of Dalhousie, in 1859. They had two sons and two daughters. Lady Edith died on 20 October 1871 in Port Adelaide in Australia, aged 32. She was buried at North Road Cemetery in Adelaide. There is a memorial headstone in the north-west corner of the first western extension to Inveresk churchyard in Scotland.

Fergusson married secondly Olive, daughter of John Henry Richman, in 1873. Olive was born in South Australia, and they were married soon after arriving in New Zealand. They had one son. She died of cholera in January 1882.

He married thirdly Isabella Elizabeth, daughter of Richard Twysden and widow of Charles Hugh Hoare, in 1893. They had no children. Fergusson's son Charles and grandson Bernard Fergusson both became Governors-General of New Zealand.

Fergusson was killed in an earthquake in Jamaica in 1907, aged 74.

== Legacy ==
The town of Jamestown and the County of Fergusson in South Australia, Fergusson Island in Papua New Guinea and Fergusson College in Pune (in his day, Poona), India are named in Fergusson's honour. A statue of Fergusson stands in the North east corner of Wellington Square in Ayr, Ayrshire, Scotland

== Arms ==
Coat of arms of Sir James Fergusson, 6th Baronet
Crest Upon a Chapeau Gules furred Ermine a Bee on a Thistle proper Escutcheon Azure a Buckle Argent between three boars's Heads couped Or on a Dexter Canton Argent a Saltire Azure surmounted of an Inescutcheon Or charged with a Lion rampant within a Double Tressure flory counter-flory Gules Supporters Two Gryphons Or armed and beaked Gules Compartment a Compartment embellished with Poplar Seedlings Motto 1 (over Crest): Dulcius Ex Asperis (All the sweeter for coming from bitterness); 2 (on Compartment): Ut Prosim Aliis (That I may be of use to others) Other versions Full achievements:

== Notes ==
Parliament of the United Kingdom
Preceded by James Hunter Blair	Member of Parliament for Ayrshire; 1854–1857	Succeeded by Lord Patrick Crichton-Stuart
Preceded by Lord Patrick Crichton-Stuart	Member of Parliament for Ayrshire; 1859–1868	Constituency abolished
New constituency	Member of Parliament for Manchester North East; 1885–1906	Succeeded by J. R. Clynes
Political offices
Preceded by James Stansfeld	Under-Secretary of State for India; 1866–1867	Succeeded by The Lord Clinton
Preceded by The Earl Belmore	Under-Secretary of State for the Home Department; 1867–1868	Succeeded by Sir Michael Hicks Beach, Bt
Preceded by James Bryce	Under-Secretary of State for Foreign Affairs; 1886–1891	Succeeded by James Lowther
Preceded by Henry Cecil Raikes	Postmaster General; 1891–1892	Succeeded by Arnold Morley
Government offices
Preceded by Sir Dominick Daly	Governor of South Australia; 1869–1873	Succeeded by Sir Anthony Musgrave
Preceded by Sir George Bowen	Governor of New Zealand; 1873–1874	Succeeded by The Marquess of Normanby
Preceded by Sir Richard Temple, Bt	Governor of Bombay; 1880–1885	Succeeded by The Lord Reay
Baronetage of Nova Scotia
Preceded by Charles Dalrymple Fergusson	Baronet (of Kilkerran); 1849–1907	Succeeded by Charles Fergusson
