= Sir James Hunter Blair, 1st Baronet =

Scottish banker, landowner and politician (1741-1787)

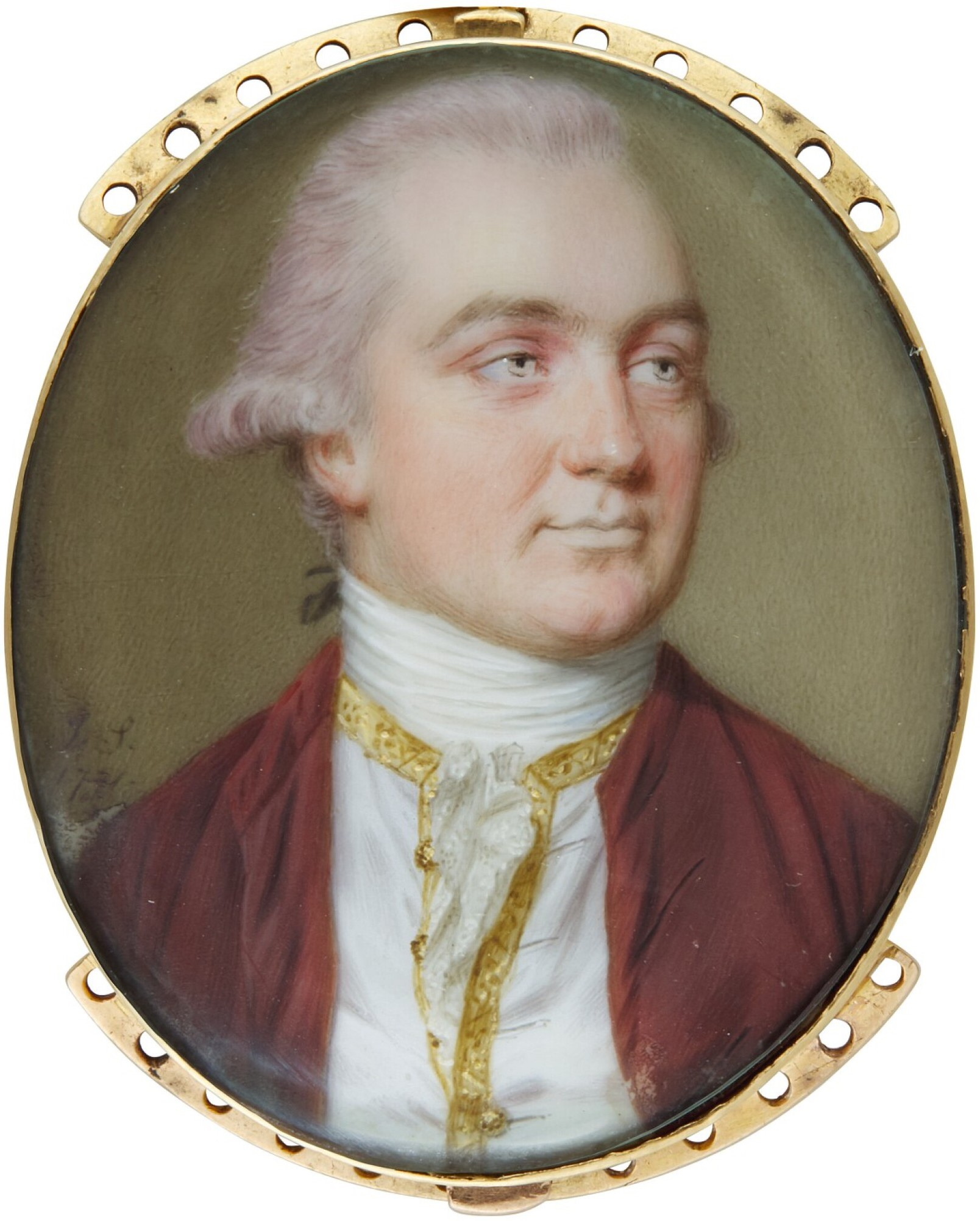
Portrait of James Hunter Blair by John Smart, 1771

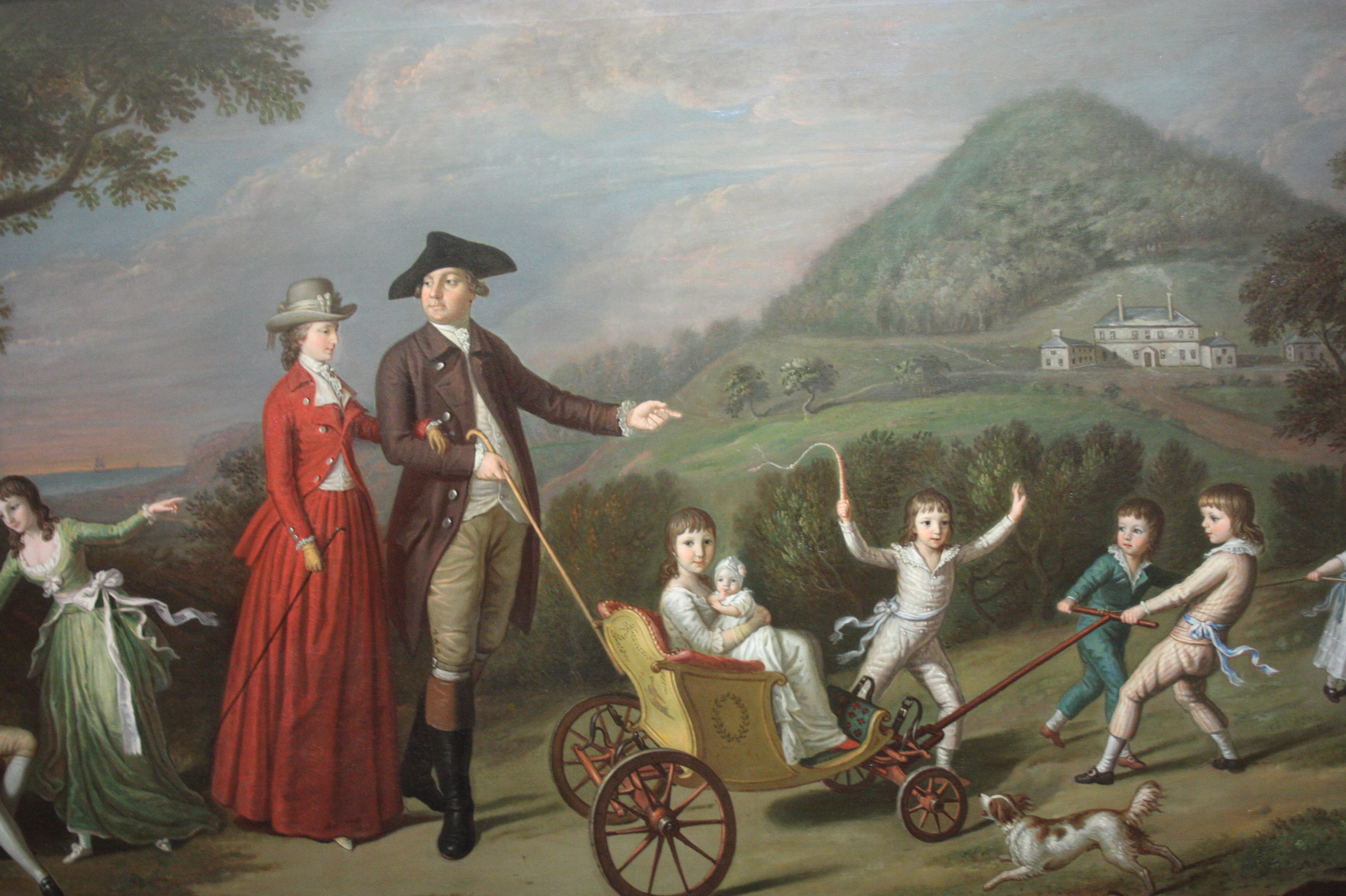
Sir James Hunter Blair and family by David Allan 1785

Sir James Hunter Blair, 1st Baronet FRSE (February 1741 – 1 July 1787) was a Scottish banker, landowner and politician.

== Life ==
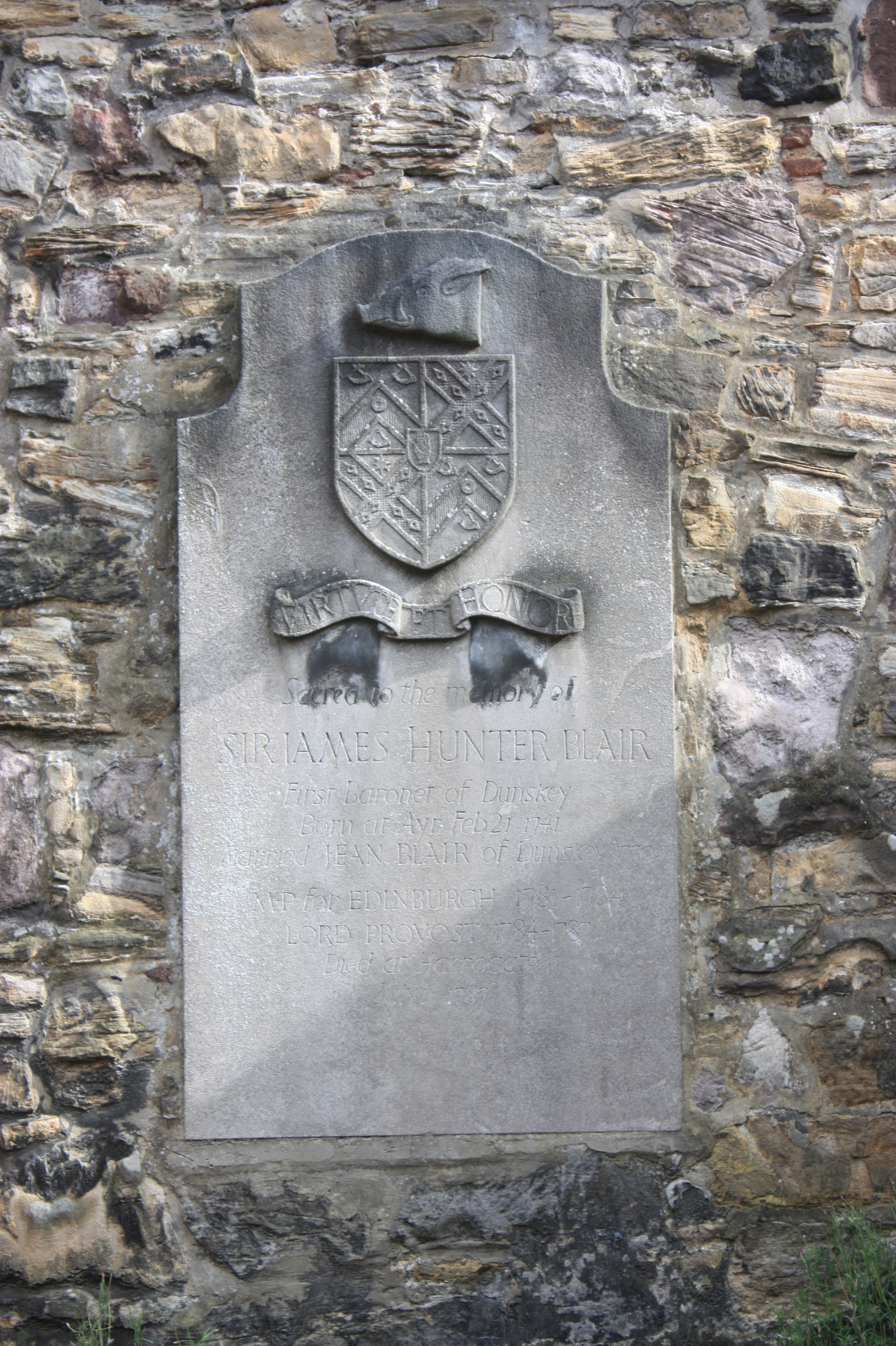
The grave of James Hunter Blair, Greyfriars Kirkyard, Edinburgh

Born John Hunter in Ayr, the son of a merchant, John Hunter of Mainholm and Millquarter and his wife, Anne Cunninghame.

In 1756 he was apprenticed to Messrs Coutts, bankers in Edinburgh and in 1763 became a partner in the banking company of Sir William Forbes, and acquired the estate of Robertland. After his marrying Jean Blair, the daughter and heiress of John Blair of Dunskey in Wigtownshire in 1770, the family name became Hunter Blair when she inherited her father's estate in 1777.

Hunter Blair was Member of Parliament for Edinburgh from 1780 to 1784 and Lord Provost of Edinburgh from 1784 to 1786. As Lord Provost, he carried through various reforms, including the beginning of work on rebuilding the University and the construction of South Bridge, over the Cowgate. The foundation stone of this bridge was laid by Lord Haddo, as Grand Master Mason of Scotland in 1785, after Parliament had passed an Act giving permission for the plans to be executed. This connection gives rise to the names Hunter Square and Blair Street immediately west of South Bridge. By negotiation his Edinburgh seat as MP was passed to Sir Adam Fergusson, 3rd Baronet of Kilkerran, in the election of August 1784.

In November 1783 Blair was a founder member of the Royal Society of Edinburgh. His Edinburgh home was on George Street, then a new Georgian townhouse in the centre of Edinburgh's First New Town. His country house was Dunskey House in Ayrshire. He had interests in an estate in Tobago.

Blair was created a baronet of Dunskey in the County of Wigtown on 27 June 1786.

Hunter Blair cordially received Robert Burns when the poet first arrived in Edinburgh. On his death, Burns drafted an elegy, beginning: "the lamp of day, with ill-presaging glare", which extols rather laboriously Blair's public virtues. Burns called it "just mediocre", but Ferguson describes it as "the disastrous Elegy on the Death of Sir James Hunter Blair".

Hunter Blair was an enthusiastic Freemason. Hunter Square and Blair Street in Edinburgh are both named after him.

Blair died in Harrogate in England, but he is buried in Greyfriars Kirkyard in Edinburgh.

His widow, Lady Hunter Blair, lived at 34 Queen Street in Edinburgh which he had purchased as a new house shortly before death. She is shown as owner of large tracts of land to the north which later became Queen Street Gardens.

== Legacy ==
Due to his role in the creation of South Bridge in the 1784, both Blair Street and Hunter Square, at the north end of the bridge are named after him.

== Family ==
After 1777, when his wife succeeded her brother to Dunskey estates, Hunter assumed and added the name of Blair to his own. He married Jane (or Jean) Blair of Dunskey in 1770. They had 14 children including Sir David Hunter Blair, 3rd Baronet FRSE (1778–1857). Dunskey Estate is currently used as a wedding and film venue.

== Family ==
There were 10 sons and four daughters of the marriage. The sons, excluding four who died young, were:

- John Hunter Blair, 2nd Baronet (1772–1800)
- David Hunter Blair, 3rd Baronet FRSE (1778–1857)
- Thomas Hunter Blair (1782–1849), later Major-General
- Robert Hunter Blair
- Forbes Hunter Blair
- James Hunter Blair.
- Anne Hunter Blair (d. 1854), who married William Mure of Caldwell (d. 1831), son of William Mure (1718–1776), and father of William Mure (1799–1860)
- Clementina Hunter Blair
- Jane Hunter Blair
- Jemima Hunter Blair.

== See also ==
- Blairquhan Castle

Parliament of Great Britain
| Preceded by Sir Lawrence Dundas | Member of Parliament for Edinburgh; 1781–1784 | Succeeded by Sir Adam Fergusson |
Baronetage of Great Britain
| New title | Baronet (of Dunskey); 1786–1787 | Succeeded by John Hunter Blair |
