= Dunskey =

Coordinates: 54°50′23″N 5°06′59″W

Dunskey Estate (also known as Portree Estate) is north of Portpatrick on the west coast of Scotland. The B-listed mansion dates from the start of the twentieth century and replaced an earlier early-eighteenth century house. Since 2017 it has been used as a tourist, wedding and film venue. Prior to the early 1700s Dunskey Castle was the main building on the estate; it is now a ruined building and scheduled monument with no public access.

The estate was the property of the Hunter-Blair family, later of Blairquhan in Ayrshire, and was acquired when Jane (or Jean) Blair of Dunskey, wife of James Hunter, succeeded her brother to Dunskey estates in 1777. A house dating from 1706 was extended in the 1830s. The Rev James Blair acquired the estate in 1648.

Dunskey Estate has been in the Orr Ewing family since 1900. The house was built 1901-04 for Charles Lindsay Orr-Ewing MP and his wife Lady Augusta Helen Elizabeth Boyle (daughter of David Boyle 7th Earl of Glasgow) to a design by James Kennedy Hunter.
