= George Fergusson, Lord Hermand =

Scottish judge

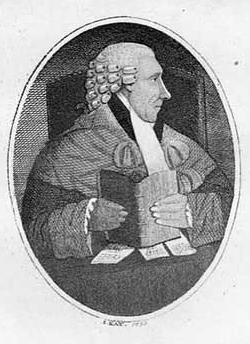
George Fergusson, Lord Hermand by John Kay

George Fergusson, Lord Hermand FRSE (25 August 1743–9 August 1827) was a Scottish advocate and judge.

== Life ==
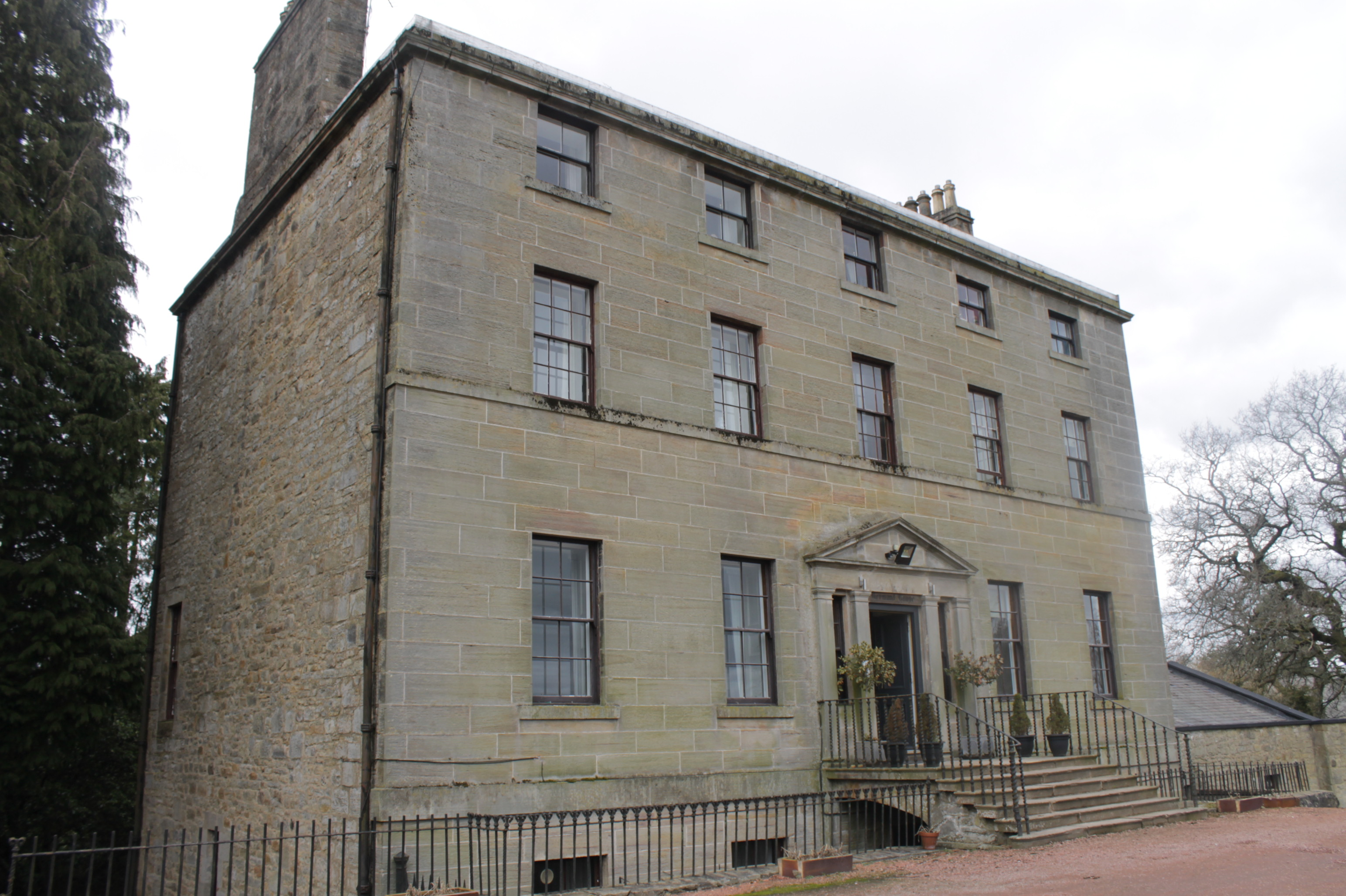
Hermand House near West Calder

He was born on 25 August 1743, the eighth son of Jean Maitland, only child of James, viscount Maitland, and grand-daughter of John, fifth earl of Lauderdale, and her husband, Sir James Fergusson, 2nd Baronet of Kilkerran in Ayrshire. His elder brother was Sir Adam Fergusson, 3rd Baronet. George attended James Mundell's School in Edinburgh then the High School 1755–56. He then studied law at the University of Edinburgh.

He was admitted a member of the Faculty of Advocates on 17 December 1765. He practised at the bar for 34 years with considerable success.

In 1783, with his brother Adam and many other notable Edinburgh figures of the Scottish Enlightenment, he was a founder member of the Royal Society of Edinburgh.

On the death of Robert McQueen, Lord Braxfield, Fergusson was made an ordinary lord of session, and took his seat on the bench as "Lord Hermand" on 11 July 1799. He was also appointed a lord justiciary on 4 August 1808, in the place of Sir William Nairne of Dunsinnam. He resigned both these offices in 1826.

Fergusson was both eccentric and a heavy drinker. An etching of Hermand by John Kay is in the first volume of 'Original Portraits' (No. 156). His portrait also appears along with those of the other judges in the 'Last Sitting of the Old Court of Session, 11 July 1808' (vol. ii. No. 300).

He died at the family estate of Hermand House east of West Calder and west of Edinburgh, on 9 August 1827. Hermand House and its estate still survive.

== Family ==
Fergusson married Graham (sic), daughter of William McDowall of Garthland, who survived him by several years. They had no children.

== Sources ==
- "Fergusson, George" . Dictionary of National Biography. London: Smith, Elder & Co. 1885–1900.
- This article incorporates text from a publication now in the public domain: "Fergusson, George". Dictionary of National Biography. London: Smith, Elder & Co. 1885–1900.
