= Sir Edward Hunter-Blair, 8th Baronet =

British landowner and forester

Sir Edward Thomas Hunter Blair, 8th Baronet, (15 December 1920 – 21 October 2006) was a British landowner and forester. He was the son of Sir James Hunter Blair, 7th Baronet and Jean Galloway McIntyre, and was educated at Sandroyd School, Eton College and Balliol College, Oxford. He served in World War II for 8 months with the King's Own Yorkshire Light Infantry (joined January 1941 - discharged September 1941). He was Civil Servant, 1941–1943; journalist (assistant Foreign Editor) 1944–1949; member of Kirkcudbrightshire county council from 1970–1971; member of the Council of the Wyndham Trust, 1992–1996; member of the Scottish Association for Public Transport from 1993 and president, Dumfries and Galloway Mountaineering Club. He published an autobiography Our Troubled Future in 1993. He succeeded to the baronetcy (created in 1786), on the death of his father in 1985.

He married firstly Norma, daughter of Walter Sidney Harris, a "Master baker", in 1956 and they adopted a son, Alan, and a daughter, Helen. He later married Jonet Clemency Wilson Reid of Robertland, daughter of David Reid of Robertland and his wife Diana Rosamond Angell, secretary of the Baronetage of Scotland.

The baronetcy devolved upon his kinsman, Patrick David Hunter Blair, born in 1958. This was because his only son, Alan Hunter Blair was adopted and consequently denied the baronetcy.

Blair died at Fleet Valley Nursing Home on 21 October 2006. His funeral took place at Straiton Parish Church on 27 October.

Baronetage of Great Britain
Preceded by James Hunter Blair	Baronet (of Dunskey); 1985–2006	Succeeded by Patrick David Hunter Blair
