= Ayrshire (UK Parliament constituency) =

Parliamentary constituency in the United Kingdom, 1801–1868

- Former county constituency for the House of Commons
- Subdivisions of Scotland: Ayrshire

1708–1868
- Seats: 1
- Created from: Ayrshire
- Replaced by: North Ayrshire; South Ayrshire.

Ayrshire was a county constituency of the House of Commons of the Parliament of Great Britain from 1708 to 1800 and of the House of Commons of the Parliament of the United Kingdom from 1801 until 1868, when it was divided into North Ayrshire and South Ayrshire.

It elected one Member of Parliament (MP), using the first-past-the-post voting system.

== Creation ==
The British parliamentary constituency was created in 1708 following the Acts of Union 1707 and replaced the former Parliament of Scotland shire constituency of Ayrshire.

== Boundaries ==
The Ayrshire constituency represented the county of Ayrshire, minus the parliamentary burghs of Ayr and Irvine, which were components of the Ayr Burghs constituency.

== History ==
The constituency elected one Member of Parliament (MP) by the first past the post system until it was divided into North Ayrshire and South Ayrshire for the 1868 general election.

== Members of Parliament ==
Election	Member	Party
1708	Francis Montgomerie	
1710	John Montgomerie	
1713	John Montgomerie	
1715	John Montgomerie	
1722	John Montgomerie	
1727	James Campbell	Whig
1734	James Campbell	Whig
1741	James Campbell	Whig
1747	Patrick Craufurd	
1754	James Mure-Campbell, later Earl of Loudoun	
1761	Archibald Montgomerie, later Earl of Eglinton	Whig
1768	David Kennedy, later Earl of Cassillis	
1774	Sir Adam Fergusson	
1780	Hugh Montgomerie, later Earl of Eglinton	
1781	Sir Adam Fergusson	
1784	Hugh Montgomerie, later Earl of Eglinton	
1789	William McDowall	
1790	Sir Adam Fergusson	
1796	Hugh Montgomerie, later Earl of Eglinton	
1796	William Fullarton	Whig
1801	William Fullarton	Whig
1802	William Fullarton	Whig
1803	Sir Hew Dalrymple-Hamilton	
1806	Sir Hew Dalrymple-Hamilton	
1807	David Boyle	
1811	Sir Hew Dalrymple-Hamilton	
1812	Sir Hew Dalrymple-Hamilton	
1818	James Montgomerie	Tory
1820	James Montgomerie	Tory
1826	James Montgomerie	Tory
1829	William Blair	Tory
1830	William Blair	Tory
1831	William Blair	Tory
1832	Richard Alexander Oswald	Whig
1835	John Dunlop	Radical
1837	John Dunlop	Radical
1839	Viscount Kelburn, later Earl of Glasgow	Conservative
1841	Viscount Kelburn, later Earl of Glasgow	Conservative
1843	Alexander Haldane Oswald	Conservative
1847	Alexander Haldane Oswald	Conservative
1852	James Hunter Blair	Conservative
1854	Sir James Fergusson	Conservative
1857	Lord Patrick Crichton-Stuart	Whig
1859	Lord Patrick Crichton-Stuart	Liberal
1859	Sir James Fergusson	Conservative
1865	Sir James Fergusson	Conservative

== Election results ==
=== Elections in the 1830s ===
General election 1830: Ayrshire
Party	Candidate	Votes	%
Tory	William Blair (Ayrshire MP)	Unopposed	
Registered electors		185	
Tory hold			

General election 1831: Ayrshire
Party	Candidate	Votes	%
Tory	William Blair (Ayrshire MP)	73	67.0
Whig	Richard Alexander Oswald	36	33.0
Majority		37	34.0
Turnout		109	58.9
Registered electors		185	
Tory hold			

General election 1832: Ayrshire
Party	Candidate	Votes	%	±%
Whig	Richard Alexander Oswald	2,152	86.9	+53.9
Tory	William Blair (Ayrshire MP)	324	13.1	−53.9
Majority		1,828	73.8	N/A
Turnout		2,476	78.6	+19.7
Registered electors		3,150		
Whig gain from Tory		Swing	+53.9	

General election 1835: Ayrshire
Party	Candidate	Votes	%	±%
Whig	Richard Alexander Oswald	Unopposed		
Registered electors		3,171		
Whig hold				

Oswald's resignation caused a by-election.

By-election, 3 July 1835: Ayrshire
Party	Candidate	Votes	%
Radical	John Dunlop	1,435	63.4
Conservative	John Cathcart	829	36.6
Majority		606	26.8
Turnout		2,264	71.4
Registered electors		3,171	
Radical gain from Whig			

General election 1837: Ayrshire
Party	Candidate	Votes	%
Radical	John Dunlop	1,559	53.2
Conservative	James Carr-Boyle	1,370	46.8
Majority		189	6.4
Turnout		2,929	73.5
Registered electors		3,985	
Radical gain from Whig			

Dunlop's death caused a by-election.

By-election, 1 May 1839: Ayrshire
Party	Candidate	Votes	%	±%
Conservative	James Carr-Boyle	1,758	56.7	+9.9
Whig	James Campbell	1,296	41.8	N/A
Chartist	Hugh Craig	46	1.5	New
Majority		462	14.9	N/A
Turnout		3,100	73.1	−0.4
Registered electors		4,242		
Conservative gain from Radical				

=== Elections in the 1840s ===
General election 1841: Ayrshire
Party	Candidate	Votes	%	±%
Conservative	James Carr-Boyle	Unopposed		
Registered electors		4,274		
Conservative gain from Radical				

Carr-Boyle succeeded to the peerage, becoming 5th Earl of Glasgow and causing a by-election.

By-election, 3 August 1843: Ayrshire
Party	Candidate	Votes	%	±%
Conservative	Alexander Haldane Oswald	Unopposed		
Conservative hold				

General election 1847: Ayrshire
Party	Candidate	Votes	%	±%
Conservative	Alexander Haldane Oswald	Unopposed		
Registered electors		4,305		
Conservative hold				

=== Elections in the 1850s ===
General election 1852: Ayrshire
Party	Candidate	Votes	%	±%
Conservative	James Hunter-Blair	1,301	52.0	N/A
Peelite	Edward Cardwell	1,200	48.0	N/A
Majority		101	4.0	N/A
Turnout		2,501	65.4	N/A
Registered electors		3,823		
Conservative hold		Swing	N/A	

Blair's death caused a by-election.

By-election, 30 December 1854: Ayrshire
Party	Candidate	Votes	%	±%
Conservative	James Fergusson	1,510	52.2	+0.2
Peelite	Alexander Haldane Oswald	1,381	47.8	−0.2
Majority		129	4.4	+0.4
Turnout		2,891	75.6	+10.2
Registered electors		3,823		
Conservative hold		Swing	+0.2	

General election 1857: Ayrshire
Party	Candidate	Votes	%	±%
Whig	Patrick Crichton-Stuart	1,663	53.3	New
Conservative	James Fergusson	1,458	46.7	−5.3
Majority		205	6.6	N/A
Turnout		3,121	78.5	+13.1
Registered electors		3,976		
Whig gain from Conservative		Swing	+5.3	

General election 1859: Ayrshire
Party	Candidate	Votes	%	±%
Liberal	Patrick Crichton-Stuart	Unopposed		
Registered electors		3,939		
Liberal hold				

Crichton-Stuart's death caused a by-election.

By-election, 31 October 1859: Ayrshire
Party	Candidate	Votes	%	±%
Conservative	James Fergusson	1,687	50.7	New
Liberal	James Campbell	1,641	49.3	N/A
Majority		46	1.4	N/A
Turnout		3,328	81.7	N/A
Registered electors		4,072		
Conservative gain from Liberal		Swing	N/A	

=== Elections in the 1860s ===
General election 1865: Ayrshire
Party	Candidate	Votes	%	±%
Conservative	James Fergusson	Unopposed		
Registered electors		4,642		
Conservative gain from Liberal				

== See also ==
- Former United Kingdom Parliament constituencies
