= Donny Lewis =

American model and actor

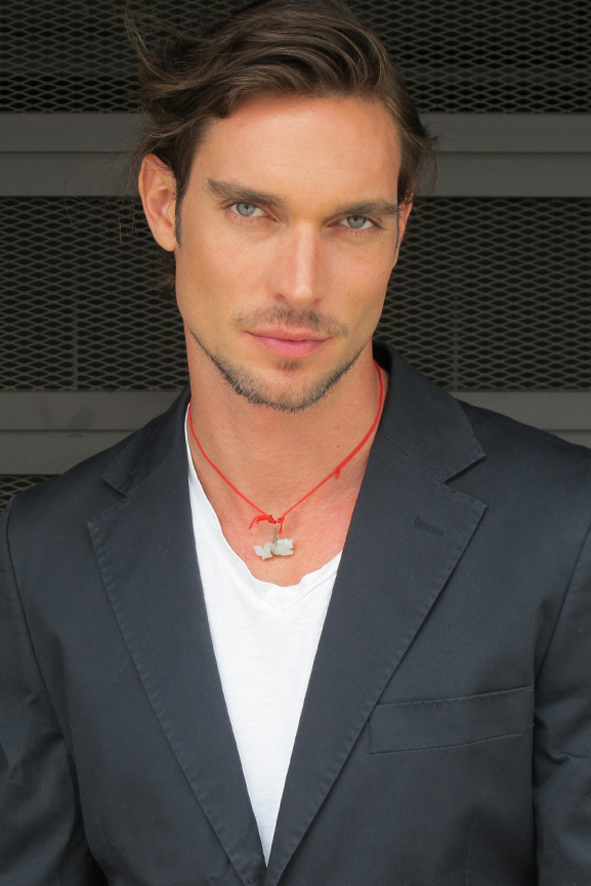
- Born: Donny Allen Lewis; December 7, 1976 (age 48); Lubbock, Texas, United States
- Modeling information
- Height: 187 cm (6 ft 1 1/2 in)
- Hair color: Brown
- Eye color: Blue
- Agency: Wilhelmina models NY & Miami, Storm models, Mega models, Major Milan, Marilynn agency Paris, Wilhelmina models Miami, Uno models, Next Canada, Heffner management, State management, CESD talent, The Campbell agency
- Website: donnylewis.com

Donny Allen Lewis (born December 7, 1976) is an American model and actor. His consistent work for major international fashion brands and publications has solidified his status as a male supermodel. His work for the promotion of sustainability in the fashion industry has led him to be named “The Male Face of Sustainable Fashion” and a contributing editor for IRK Magazine.

== Early life ==
Lewis was born in Lubbock, Texas, on December 7, 1976. At the age of 17 he was discovered at the South Plains Mall by Peter John and Mike Beaty, signed with Next Model Management and moved to New York at 18.

== Modelling career ==
Lewis began working as a model at the age of 18 by signing a two-year contract with GUESS, shot by the photographer Pablo Alfaro. This brought him to the public eye and aroused the interest of the fashion industry. He has worked with photographers, Greg Kadel (Valentino Intimo and Valentino Sand), Mert Alas and Marcus Piggott, Camilla Akrans, Terry Richardson, Ellen von Unwerth, Mario Sorrenti and Michel Comte and for fashion designers and brands such as Salvatore Ferragamo, Valentino, Yohji Yamamoto, Bulgari, Roberto Cavalli, Hugo Boss, Kenneth Cole, Rene Lezard, Armani, Perry Ellis, Mac cosmetics, and H&M. He has appeared in numerous TV commercials, such as FA, Jägermeister and Michelob and in music videos, among others for David Guetta and Kylie Minogue. Lewis was also part of two art projects by the photographer/artist Spencer Tunick and appeared on a double page in issue 52 of Visionaire, shot by Mert Alas & Marcus Piggott.

Lewis is signed with Wilhelmina of New York and in 2011 appeared in advertisement campaigns for Davidoff and Pal Zileri. Subsequent clients include:

- Davidoff again in 2013
- Lancaster Paris alongside Daisy Loewe shot by photographer Guy Aroch in 2014
- Lucchesse alongside Jessica Miller shot by photographer Daniel Jackson in 2014 for both SS and FW
- Otto Kern shot by photographer Andreas Ortner in 2015 for Otto Kern Signature and Otto Kern Signature Supreme fragrances as well as Otto Kern Signature Speed in 2016
- Stefano Ricci in 2018 SS advertising Campaign
- The Fashionisto Fashion editorial featuring Donny Lewis portraying the iconic Yves Saint Laurent published 2020
- 120% Lino SS 2020 advertising Campaign
- Giorgio Armani via press release in The Fashionisto
