= Jim Blair (Australian footballer) =

Australian rules footballer

Personal information
- Full name: James Hugh Blair
- Born: 23 February 1874; Melbourne
- Died: 1 July 1953 (aged 79); Kooyong, Victoria
- Original team: Footscray (VFA)
- Height: 173 cm (5 ft 8 in)
- Weight: 79 kg (174 lb)

Playing career^{1}
Years	Club	Games (Goals)
1903	Collingwood	1 (0)
- ^{1} Playing statistics correct to the end of 1903.

Jim Blair (23 February 1874 – 1 July 1953) was an Australian rules footballer who played with Collingwood in the Victorian Football League (VFL).
