= Water of Girvan =

River in SCotland

Coordinates: 55°15′N 4°51′W

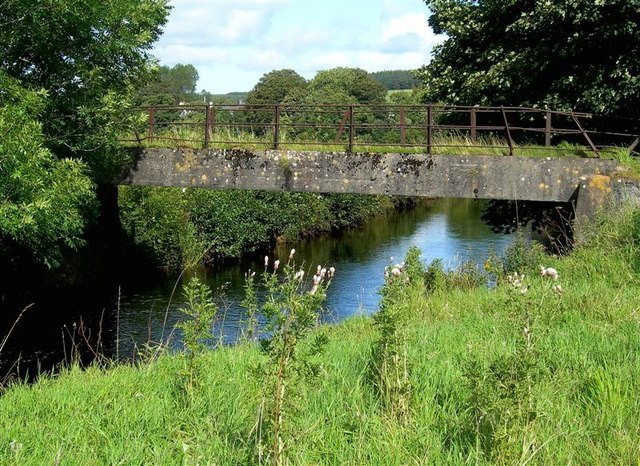
This bridge takes a vehicle track across the Water of Girvan, and is part of the Straiton Paths' "Village Ramble"

The Water of Girvan (or River Girvan) (Scottish Gaelic: Garbhan / Abhainn Gharbhain) is a river in South Ayrshire, which has its source at Loch Girvan Eye in the Carrick Forest section of Galloway Forest Park. This 28-mile (45-kilometre) river passes through the villages of Straiton, Crosshill and Dailly en route to the Firth of Clyde at Girvan Harbour.
