= Hunter-Blair baronets =

Title in the Baronetage of Great Britain

- Escutcheon of the Hunter-Blair baronets of Dunskey
- Creation date: 1786
- Status: extant
- Motto: Vigilantia, robur, voluptas, Vigilance, strength, pleasure

The Hunter-Blair baronetcy of Dunskey in the County of Wigtown is a title in the Baronetage of Great Britain. It was created for the member of parliament, and Lord Provost of Edinburgh, James Hunter-Blair on 27 June 1786.

== Hunter-Blair baronets of Dunskey, Wigtown (1786) ==
- Sir James Hunter-Blair, 1st Baronet (1741–1787)
- Sir John Hunter-Blair, 2nd Baronet (1772–1800)
- Sir David Hunter-Blair, 3rd Baronet FRSE (1778–1857)
- Sir Edward Hunter-Blair, 4th Baronet (1818–1896)
- Sir David Oswald Hunter-Blair, 5th Baronet (1853–1939)
- Sir Edward Hunter-Blair, 6th Baronet (1858–1945)
- Sir James Hunter-Blair, 7th Baronet (1889–1985)
- Sir Edward Thomas Hunter-Blair, 8th Baronet (15 December 1920 – 21 October 2006)
- Sir Patrick David Hunter Blair, 9th Baronet (born 12 May 1958)

The heir apparent is the present holder's eldest son Ronan Hunter Blair (born 1995).

Baronetage of Great Britain
Preceded by Hoare baronets	Hunter-Blair baronets of Dunskey; 27 June 1786	Succeeded by Farrell-Skeffington baronets
