= Greenlees =

Greenlees is a surname. Notable people with the surname include:

- Allison Greenlees (1896–1979), Scottish Girlguide
- Don Greenlees (born 1875), Scottish footballer
- Duncan Greenlees (1899–1966), theologist
- Gavin Greenlees (1930–1983), Australian poet
- Georgina Greenlees (1849–1932), Scottish artist
- Jack Greenlees, Scottish actor
- James Greenlees (1878–1951), Scottish rugby player and educationist
- Robert Greenlees (1820–1894), Scottish artist and educationalist
- Ronalyn Greenlees (born 1971), Filipino lawn bowler
- Thomas Duncan Greenlees (1858–1929), Scottish psychiatrist
- Weir Greenlees (1882–1975), English cricketer and distiller
- Ysobel Greenlees (1902–1996), Scottish golfer and founder of the Greenlees Trophy League

== See also ==
- Greenlee (surname)
- Greenlees, an area of Cambuslang, Scotland
