= List of places in North Ayrshire =

Map of places in North Ayrshire compiled from this list
See the list of places in Scotland for places in other counties.

This List of places in North Ayrshire is a list of links for any town, village, hamlet, castle, golf course, historic house, nature reserve, reservoir, river, and other place of interest in the North Ayrshire council area of Scotland.

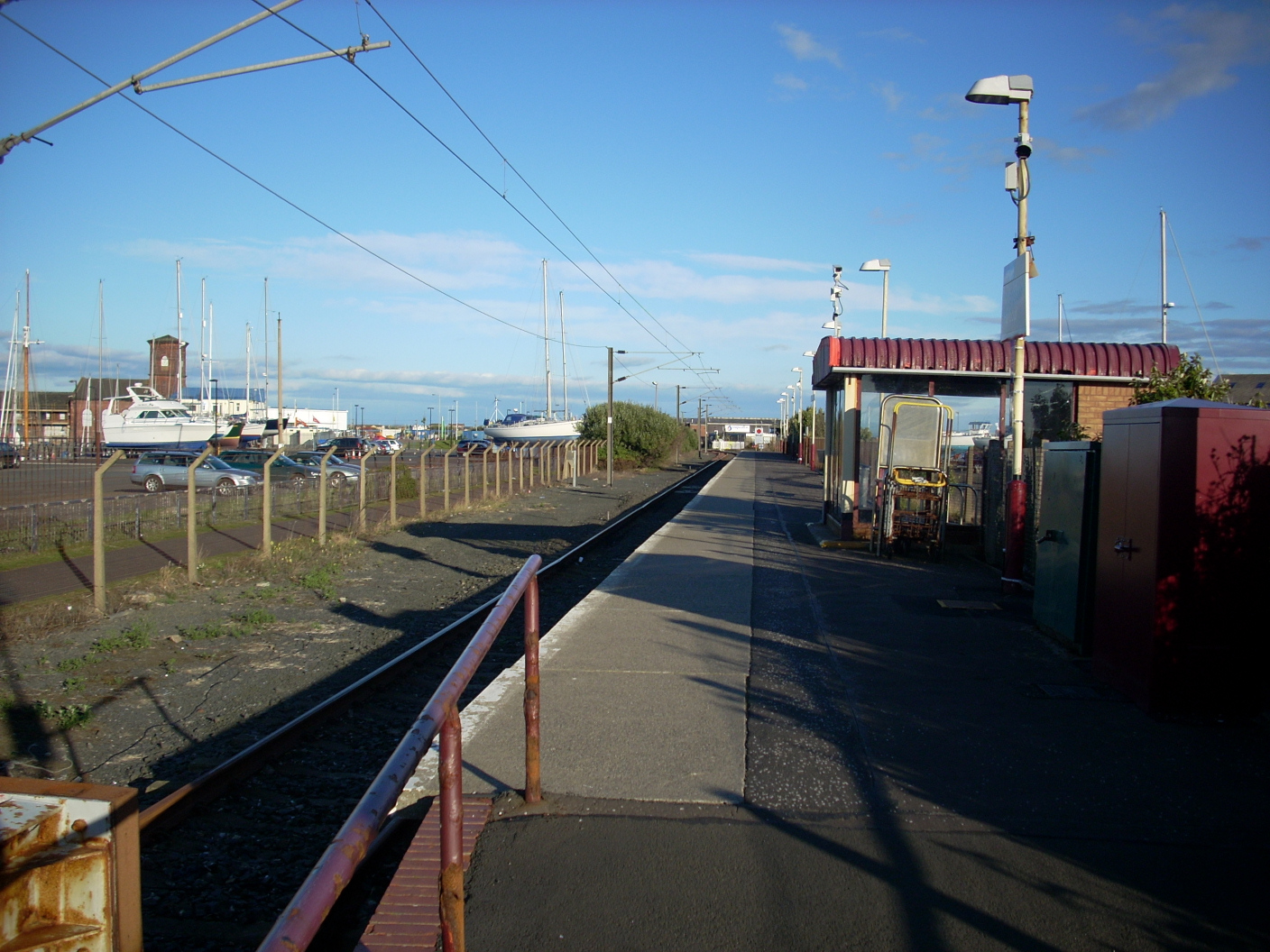
Ardrossan Harbour Railway

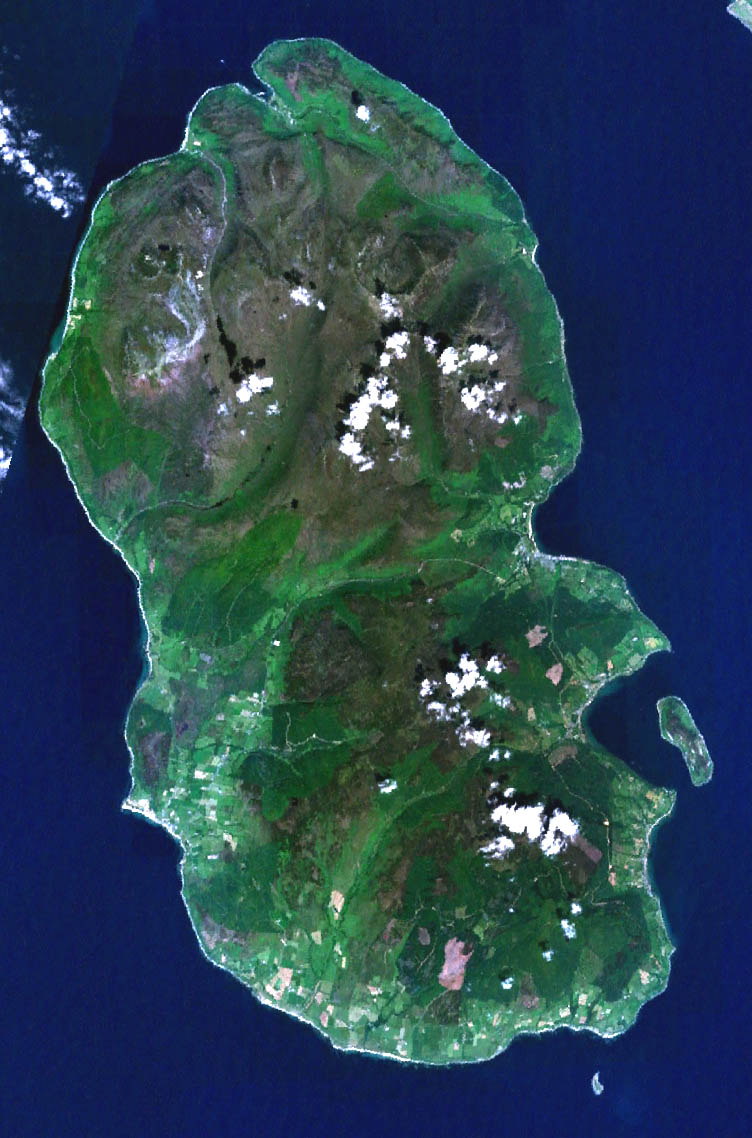
Isle of Arran

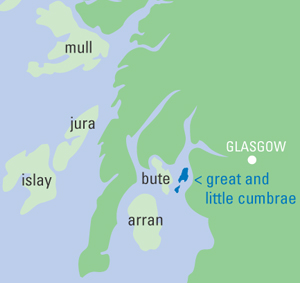
Map of South West Scotland Islands

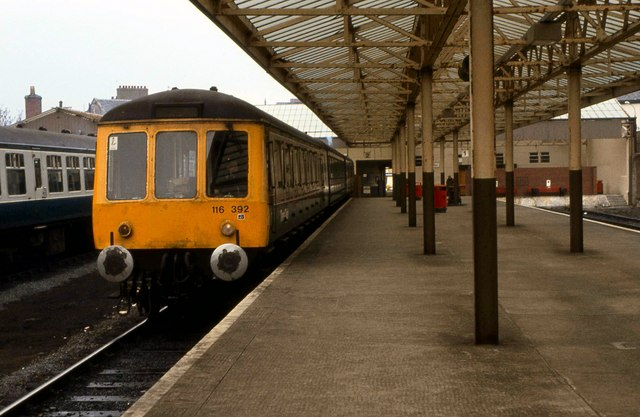
Largs Railway Station

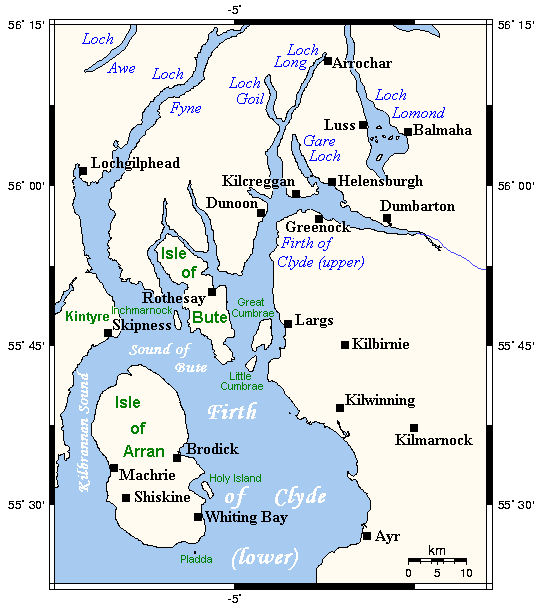
Firth of Clyde Map

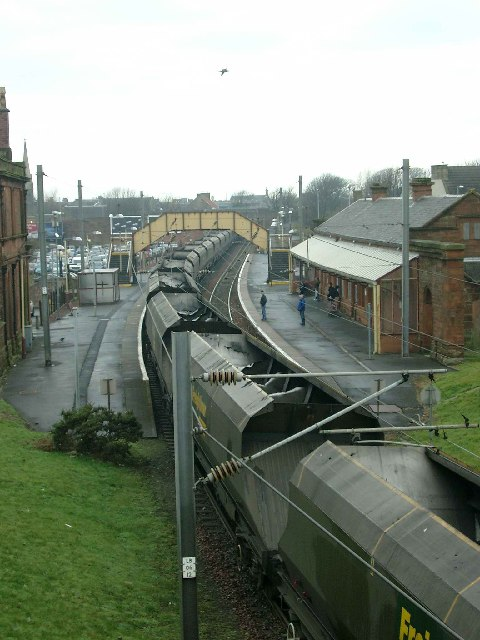
Saltcoats Railway Station

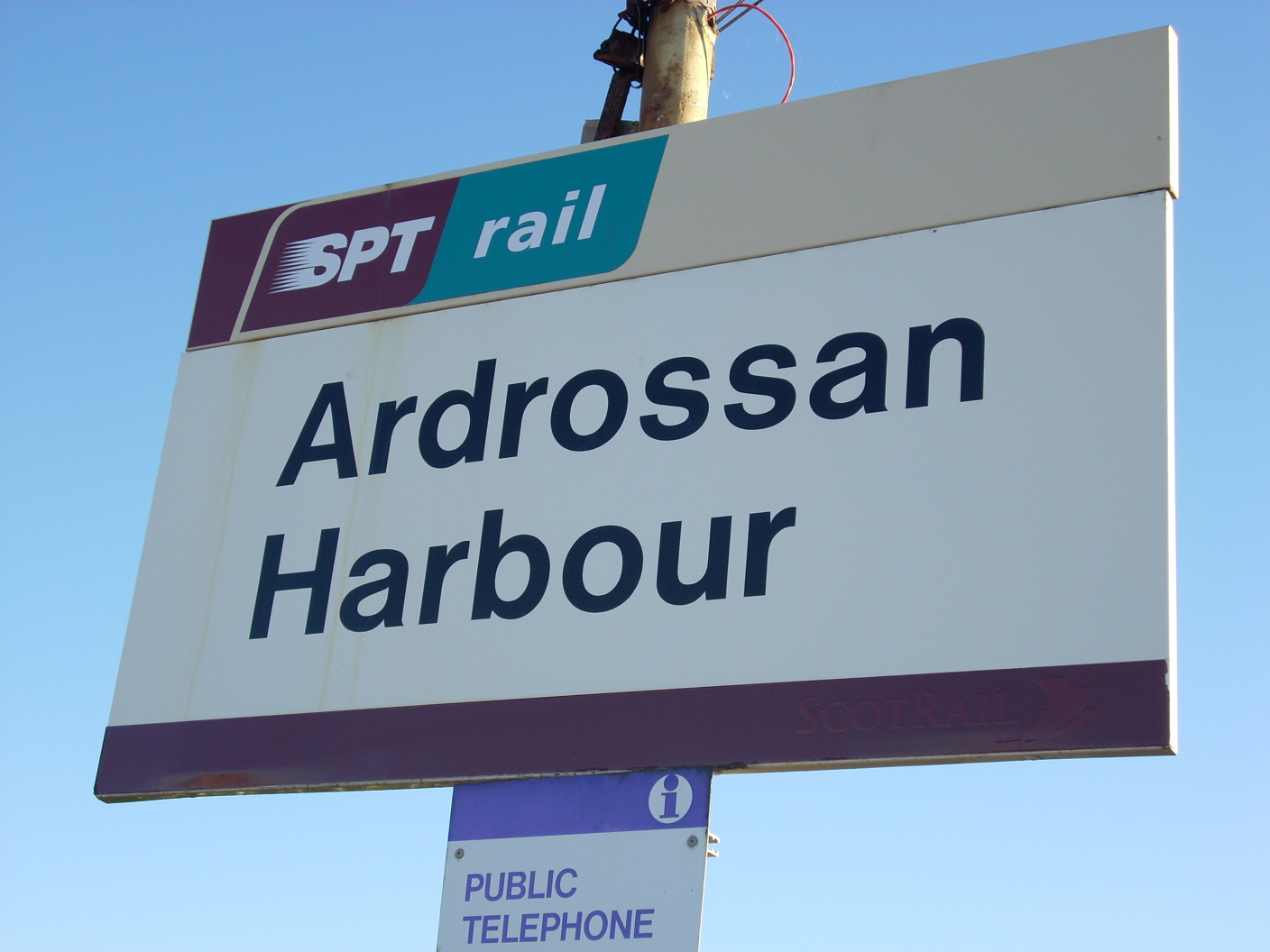
Ardrossan Harbour

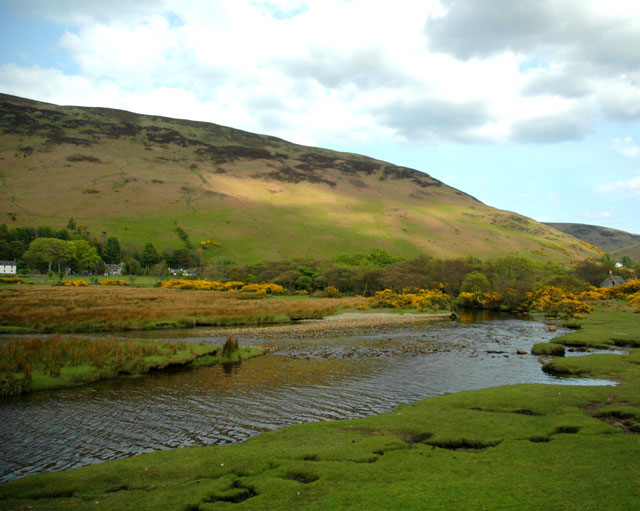
Lochranza, Arran

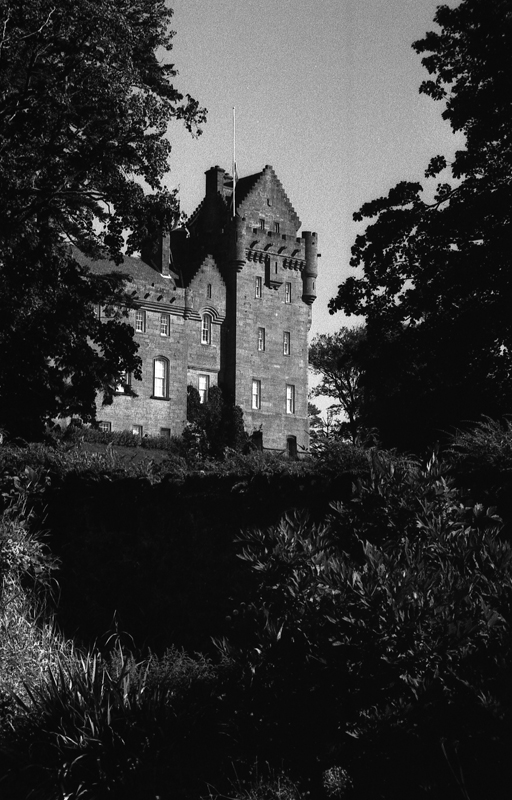
Brodick Castle, Arran

== A ==
- Ardrossan, Ardrossan Railway
- Arran, Arran Brewery

== B ==
- Beith
- Benslie
- Blackwaterfoot
- Bourtreehill
- Brodick, Brodick Castle

== C ==
- Cathedral of the Isles
- Cladach
- Clyde Muirshiel Regional Park
- Cunninghamhead

== D ==
- Dalry
- Dreghorn

== E ==
- Eglinton Country Park, Eglinton Tournament Bridge

== F ==
- Fairlie
- Fergushill
- Firth of Clyde

== G ==
- Garrier Burn
- Girdle Toll
- Glengarnock
- Goldenberry Hill
- Great Cumbrae

== I ==
- Irvine, Irvine railway station

== K ==
- Kilbirnie
- Kilwinning

== L ==
- Laigh Milton viaduct
- Lambroughton
- Lamlash
- Lanarkshire and Ayrshire Railway
- Largs, Largs railway station
- Little Cumbrae
- Lochranza

== M ==
- Millport
- Montfode Castle
- Museum of the Cumbraes
- Meigle

== P ==
- Perceton
- Portencross

== S ==
- Saltcoats, Saltcoats railway station
- Seamill
- Skelmorlie
- Skelmorlie Aisle
- Springside, Springside railway station
- Stevenston

== W ==
- West Kilbride, West Kilbride railway station
- Whiting Bay

== See also ==
- List of places in Scotland
- List of islands of Scotland
