= Greenlee (surname) =

For the tool company, see Greenlee. For the county in the USA, see Greenlee County, Arizona.

Greenlee is a surname. Notable people with the surname include:

- Bill Greenlee (1938–2010), American lobbyist
- Bob Greenlee (born 1941), American businessman, politician, and philanthropist
- Charles Greenlee (musician) (1927–1993), American jazz trombonist
- David Greenlee (actor) (born 1960), American actor and voice actor
- David N. Greenlee (born 1943), American diplomat
- Fritz Greenlee (born 1943), American football player
- Gus Greenlee (1893–1952), African-American businessman and Negro League baseball owner
- Jim M. Greenlee (born 1952), American judge and politician
- Kathy Greenlee, American politician
- Karen Greenlee (born 1956), American necrophiliac
- Sam Greenlee (1930–2014), American author and poet
- Tom Greenlee (born 1945), American football player
- William K. Greenlee, American politician

== See also ==
- Greenlees
