= Old Harbour =

Old Harbour may refer to:

- Old Harbour, Jamaica, town
- The Old Harbour, Kingston upon Hull, early harbouring point on the River Hull
- The Old harbour (Porto Antico) in Genoa, Italy
- The Old Harbour in Weymouth, Dorset, England
- The Old Harbour in Portencross, Scotland

== See also ==
- Old Harbor, Alaska
