= Hunterston Brooch =

Celtic brooch found in North Ayrshire, Scotland

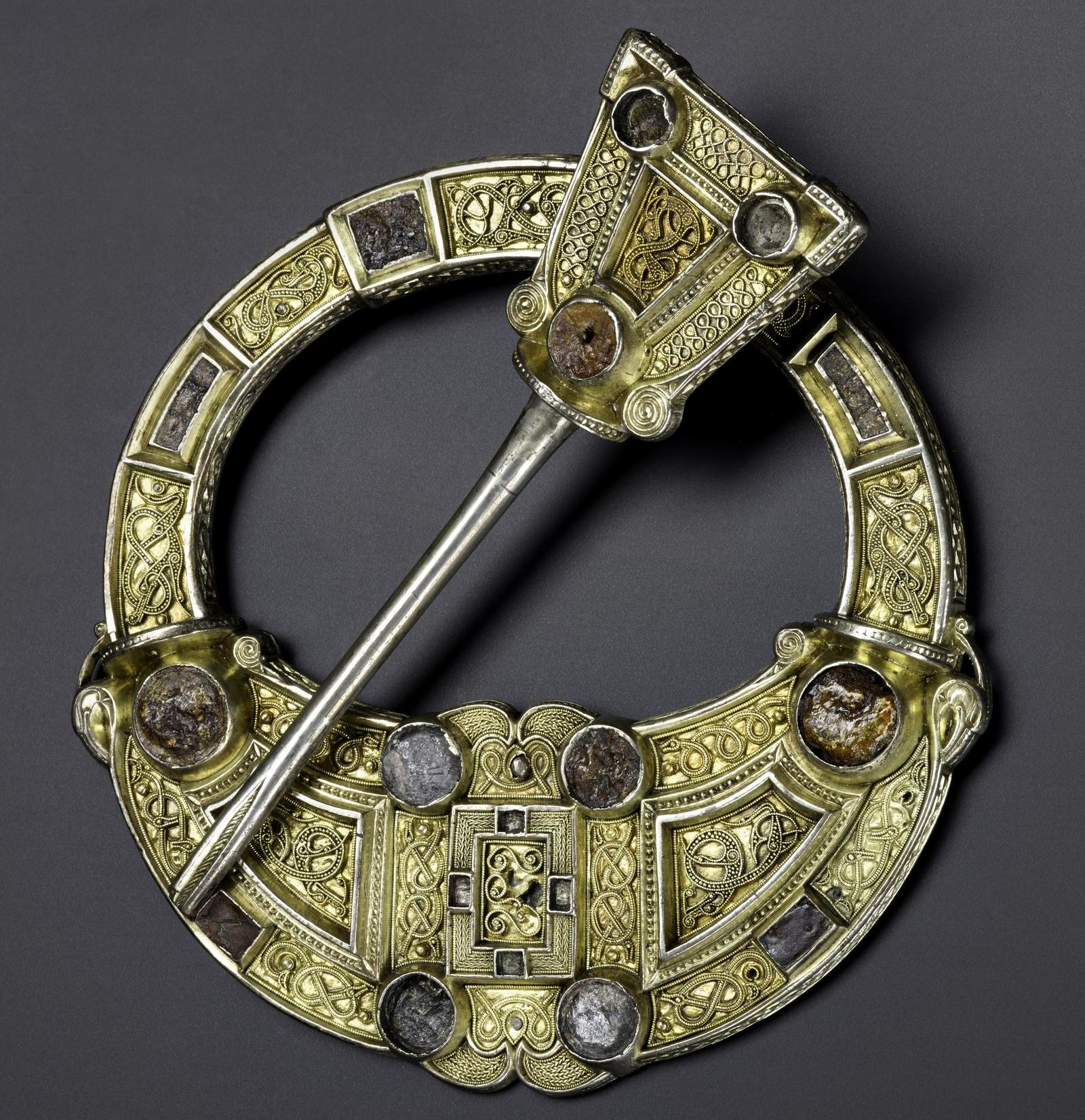
The brooch is cast in silver, mounted with gold, silver and amber decoration. c. 700 AD

The Hunterston Brooch is a highly important Celtic brooch of "pseudo-penannular" type found near Hunterston, North Ayrshire, Scotland, in either, according to one account, 1826 by two men from West Kilbride, who were digging drains at the foot of Goldenberry Hill, or in 1830.

The Hunterston Brooch is clearly an object of very high status, indicating its owner's power and prestige. With the Tara Brooch in the National Museum of Ireland and the Londesborough Brooch in the British Museum, it is considered one of the finest of over 50 highly elaborate surviving Irish Celtic brooches, and "arguably the earliest of the ornate penannular brooches from Britain and Ireland".

It is in the collection of the National Museum of Scotland in Edinburgh.

== Description ==
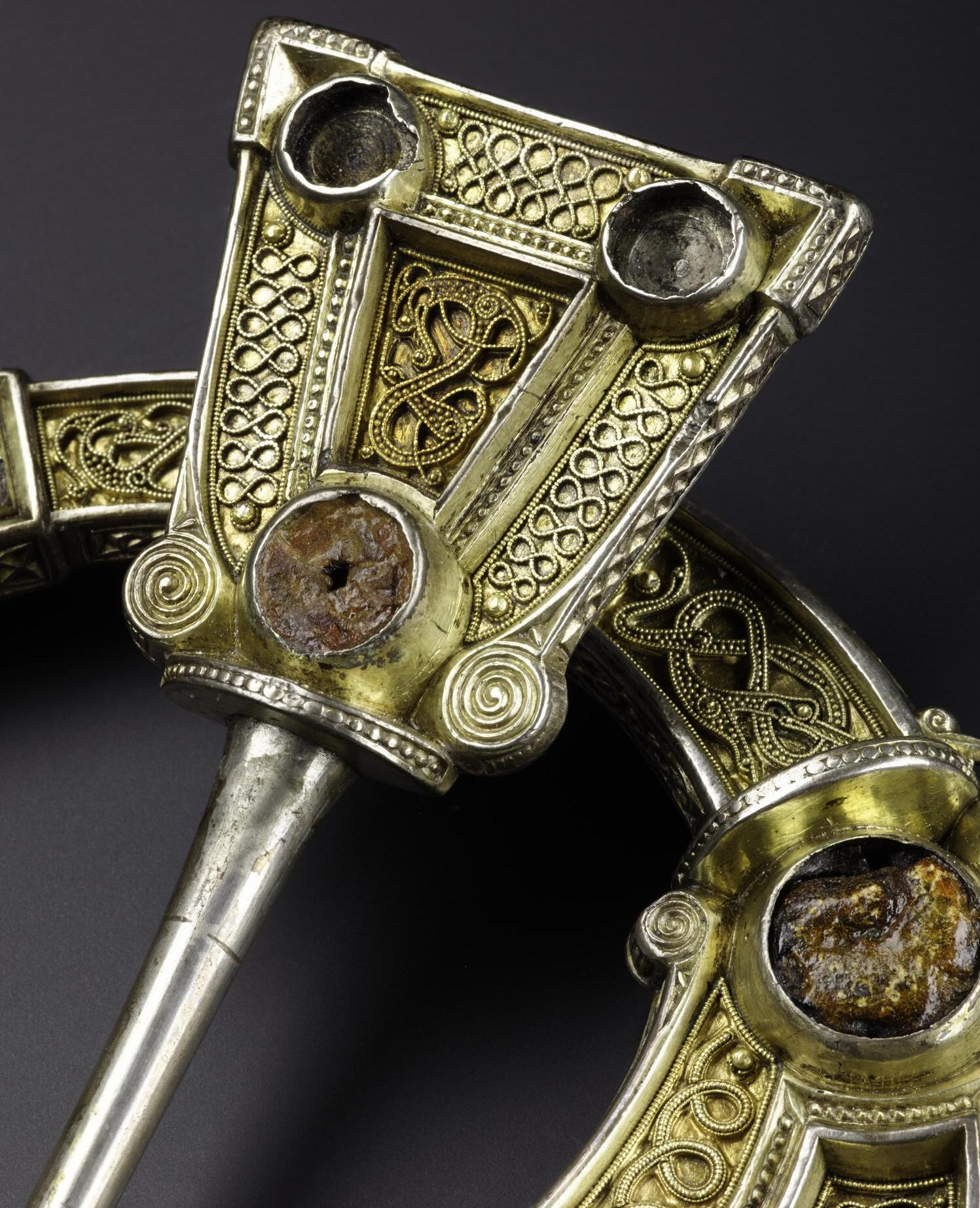
Detail of pin-head

Made within a few decades of 700 AD, the Hunterston Brooch is cast in silver and gilt. It is set with pieces of amber (most now missing) and decorated with interlaced animal bodies in gold filigree. The diameter of the ring is 12.2 cm, and in its centre there is a cross and a golden glory representing the risen Christ, surrounded by tiny bird heads. The pin, which is broken, can travel freely around the ring as far as the terminals—necessary for fastening; it is now 13.1 cm long, but was probably originally 15 cm or more.

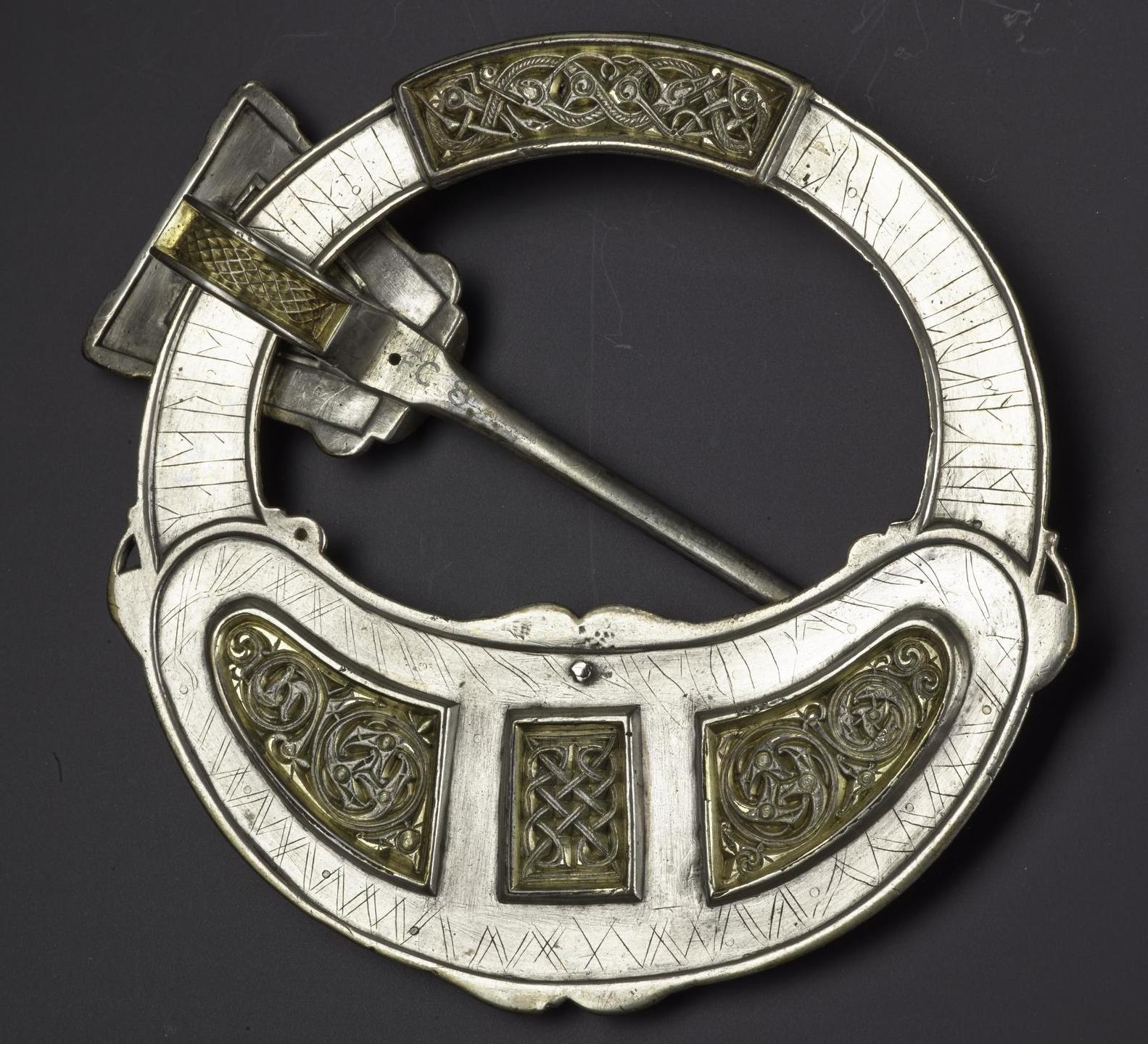
Rear view

The brooch has a complex construction typical of the most elaborate Irish brooches. Panels of filigree work were created separately on gold trays, which were then fitted into the main silver-gilt body. On the reverse, four panels of silver-gilt were also inserted; as in other examples like the Tara Brooch the decoration on the reverse uses older curvilinear "Celtic" motifs looking back to La Tène style Insular Celtic decoration, though on the Hunterston Brooch such motifs also appear on the front.

The back of the brooch has a scratched inscription in runes in the Old Norse language, probably 10th century, "Melbrigda owns this brooch"; Maél Brigda, "devotee of Bridgit" is a common Gaelic female name, though seen as male by other sources. Much later ownership inscriptions are not uncommon on elaborate Celtic brooches, often from Norse-Gael contexts.

== Possible origin ==
Such brooches were worn by rulers or gifted by the ruler to people of importance. The Hunterston brooch evidences power and wealth shortly before the Viking Age impacted Britain.

The Hunterston brooch may have been made at a royal site, such as Dunadd in Argyll, though is more likely to have been made in Ireland, especially as its pseudo-penannular form is typical of Irish brooches, whereas the truly penannular form remained usual in Pictish brooches. On the other hand, its style is closely comparable to a terminal fragment of a penannular brooch found in Dunbeath in 1860 which probably was made in Scotland; craftsmen may have travelled across the area using the locally popular forms. Lloyd and Jennifer Laing feel it was probably made in Dalriada, and the Museum of Scotland say "The style of the brooch has Irish parallels, while the filigree resembles metalwork from England. The brooch was probably made in western Scotland where the two traditions were joined, or perhaps in Ireland by a craftsman trained in foreign techniques."
