= Murder of Mary Speir Gunn =

1913 murder case in Scotland

Coordinates: 55.70611°N 4.90299°W

Mary Speir Gunn
- Born: Mary Speir Gunn; 31 August 1862; Stevenston
- Died: 18 October 1913 (aged 51); Northbank Cottage, Portencross, Scotland
- Cause of death: bullet wound through the heart
- Resting place: Southern Necropolis, Glasgow
- Citizenship: British
- Occupation: Telephone operator
- Parent(s): Gilbert Gunn and Jane Speir

Notes
- Murdered by a person unknown

Mary Speir Gunn (31 August 1862 – 18 October 1913) was murdered in a shooting attack at the isolated Northbank Cottage near Portencross in North Ayrshire, Scotland on the evening of Saturday, 18 October 1913. Six shots were fired through the living-room window at night. Three shots struck Mary Gunn, the fatal one piercing her heart. Two shots hit her sister Jessie McLaren, who collapsed with a bullet lodged in her back, but she survived the attack. Jessie's husband, Alexander McLaren, was injured in the index finger of his left hand.

Newspapers described the murder at the time as "a terrible and most mysterious tragedy". Nobody was charged or prosecuted for the crime, which remains an unsolved murder.

== Mary Gunn ==
Mary Speir Gunn was born in Stevenston in North Ayrshire to parents Jane Speir of Dalry and Gilbert Gunn of Gateside. Mary was one of three sisters and her father was a well known railway contractor and was said to be one of Scotland's strongest men. In 1881 and 1891 Mary was living in Beith at Burnside and was said to be very good looking, the Burnsian style sobriquet "Beauty of Beith" accurately describing her. In 1891 she is recorded to have had the then unusual occupation of "telephone operator", indeed being the town's first in 1883; she later worked at Ardrossan in the same capacity.

In 1901 Mary was working for and living in Wigtownshire with her brother-in-law Alexander McLaren, then aged 48, a self-employed baker, his wife and Mary's sister Jessie, also aged 48, and Jane Speir Gunn, aged 83, Mary's mother. This and other supporting information has been supplied via David R Craig's family tree. Alexander had run the Glengarnock Iron and Steel Company Store before moving to Port William in Wigtownshire. Alexander built an evangelistic Ebenezer Hall at Port William which he operated and was also on the school board. Alexander was offered the post office at Taynuilt and moved there with his wife before moving into farming and then retiring to Portencross.

Mary had stayed at Port William to tie up the family affairs and when she joined them in Taynuilt she found that she was just expected to work on the farm. Mary's middle sister lived in Canada with her husband John Craig and Mary decided to accept her invitation to join them, however despite a promising love affair she was back at Taynuilt before long. Her romantic interlude in Saskatchewan was not found to have any link to her murder. In 1913 at the age of 51 Mary was living at the remote and inaccessible Northbank Cottage, an old farm situated beneath the precipitous red sandstone cliffs on the raised beach near Portencross with her sister Jessie and brother-in-law Alex.

== Background ==
Alexander McLaren and his wife Jessie and Mary Gunn were not locals and had only moved in during the month of May 1913. Alexander had been a self-employed baker, a farmer and something of an evangelist. He was sixty at the time of the murder and his wife Jessie was sixty-one whilst Mary was only forty-nine and still very good looking. The family had kept to themselves and were regarded locally as being quite well off. Alexander had recently sold the sheep from his old Taynuilt farm at a Perth auction and therefore had £100 that a potential thief may have thought was held as cash by him at Northbank Cottage.

On the day of the murder Mary went shopping in West Kilbride, Alexander walked out to meet her on her return journey and they met a rather nondescript stranger who they walked and talked with.

== The murder ==
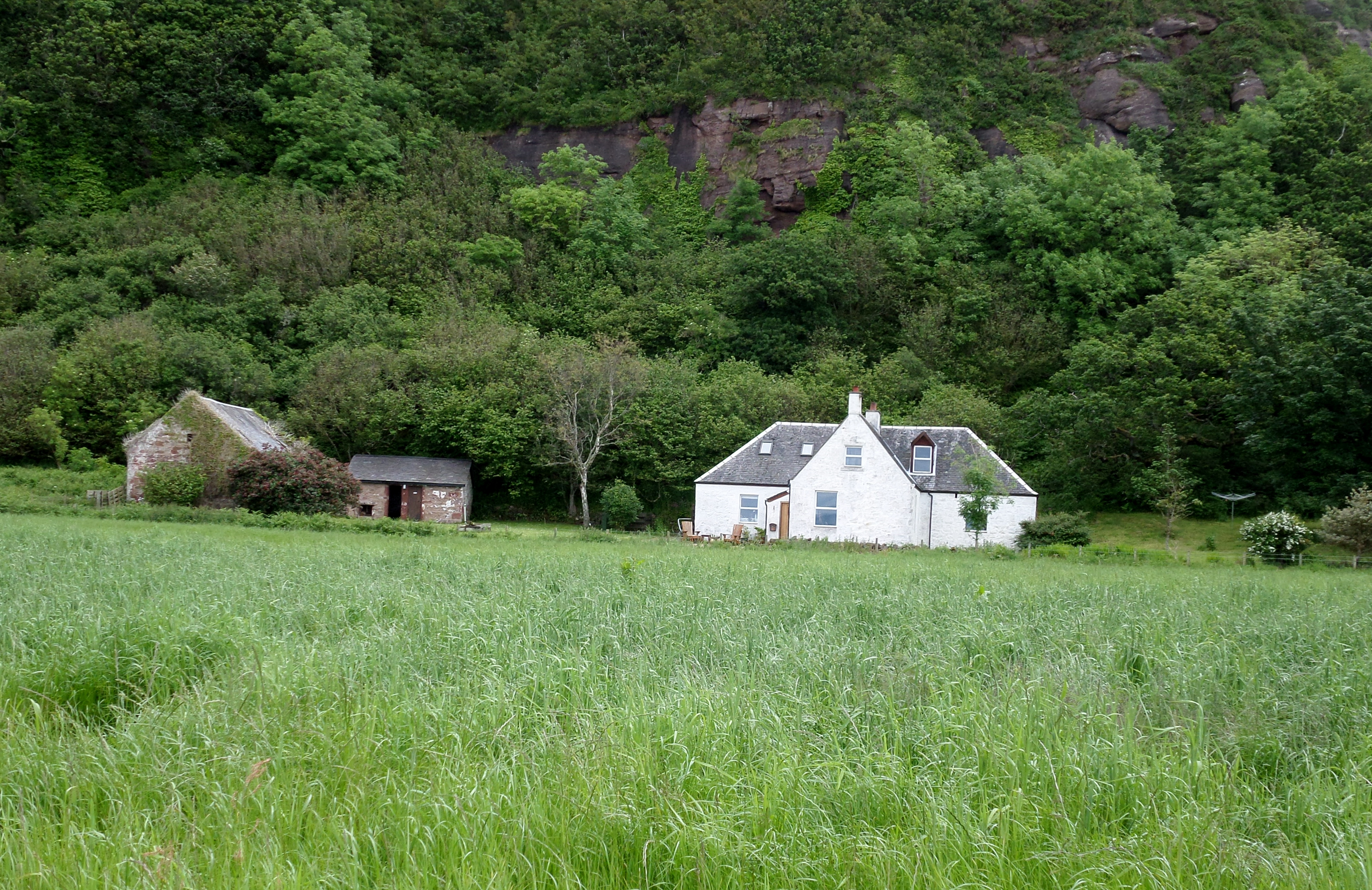
Northbank Cottage

On the dark, wet and stormy evening of Saturday 18 October 1913 the family were relaxing in front of an open fire in the parlour with only an oil lamp throwing a low light over the room. The two ladies were knitting and Alexander was reading aloud from a book, At Sunwich Port by W. W. Jacobs with his back to the only window in the room. Suddenly at around 8.30 pm a pistol shot rang out, followed by five more shots. Mary cried out "Alex I'm shot" and collapsed with three bullet wounds, the fatal one piercing her heart. Alexander had time to shout to his wife " Floor, Floor "; however, Jessie was then hit by two bullets and Alex, shot first, had a wound to the hand, penetrating his left index finger to the bone, made when the bullet passed through the book he was reading, throwing it to the floor. At least one fired bullet was found lying outside the broken window, having ricocheted off the stone walls, and two bullets were also removed from the chair in which Alexander had been seated that night.

Alexander, not aware that he had been shot at first, leapt to his feet, pushing his wife to the floor and then rushing out to release his collie and eight-month-old Scottish terrier pup from an outhouse in an effort to catch the murderer. However, he found nothing and only three sets of footprints and one or more used bullets were found as evidence of the act. The footprints did not match Alexander's boots.

== Aftermath ==
Having no telephone in the house, Alex ran first to the farm of Alexander Murray at Portencross where he informed them of the attacks and then ran to the nearby mansion house of Auchenames at Portencross where the laird, William Adams, had a telephone and the police and a doctor were quickly on the scene, arriving by taxi; although strangely, the police had no phone and a friend of the laird in West Kilbride had to knock on the police station door and pass on the news. Mary was dead and Jessie had a bullet removed from her back by the doctor. Alexander was taken to West Kilbride Police Station where, suffering from shock, he did his best to recount the happenings of the incident.

The gun was found through the calibre of the shell case to be a heavy army revolver of the Colt-type, however it was never located and may have been disposed of in the sea. Jessie MacLaren was treated at Kilmarnock Infirmary and was only released in January 1914. The Southern Necropolis in Glasgow is the final resting place of Mary Speir Gunn, interred wearing her favourite plaid. Plaster casts were made of the six footprints and enquiries revealed that an unidentified man had recently been to three farms in the locality seeking directions to Portencross, a fact corroborated by a group of local schoolchildren. It was odd that the dogs in their nearby outhouse had not barked as they usually would have at the occasional passing stranger and the revolver was fired at an acute angle through the window as if the perpetrator was afraid that he or she would be recognised as someone known to the victims.

The police made extensive enquiries but to no avail, investigating links as far away as Saskatchewan in Canada where Mary Gunn had a boyfriend. One police theory was that the murderer committed suicide by drowning, an unsuccessful watch was kept for a body and the Ardneil Woods were searched without success. All reports of the police involvement emphasise how thorough the investigation was. Jessie McLaren recovered from superficial wounds to a kidney, but Mary had died at the scene. It was thought that the murderer had targeted Alexander as the intended victim.

Alexander McLaren stated that he had no idea what the motive was as he had no disputes with anyone and a robbery "gone wrong" seemed unlikely. A £100 reward was offered but no one ever came forward. A legal action against Alexander was brought by Mrs Elizabeth Walker or Gibson, the keeper of the boarding house at Portencross in 1915 who claimed that her business had suffered badly following accusations from Alexander that she knew something about the murder or had been somehow involved, however the complainant dropped the action and had to pay her own costs.

Alexander and Jessie left Northbank Cottage and seem to have moved to Garnock Street in Dalry, possibly living with a friend. Despite the trauma of the event and its aftermath they remained together. The trail went cold and the multiple attack and murder, together with the motive behind the shootings, remains an unsolved mystery to this day. Jack House speculates that Alexander was the perpetrator of the crime and his wife corroborated his version through being in shock at the time.

== Views of the area ==
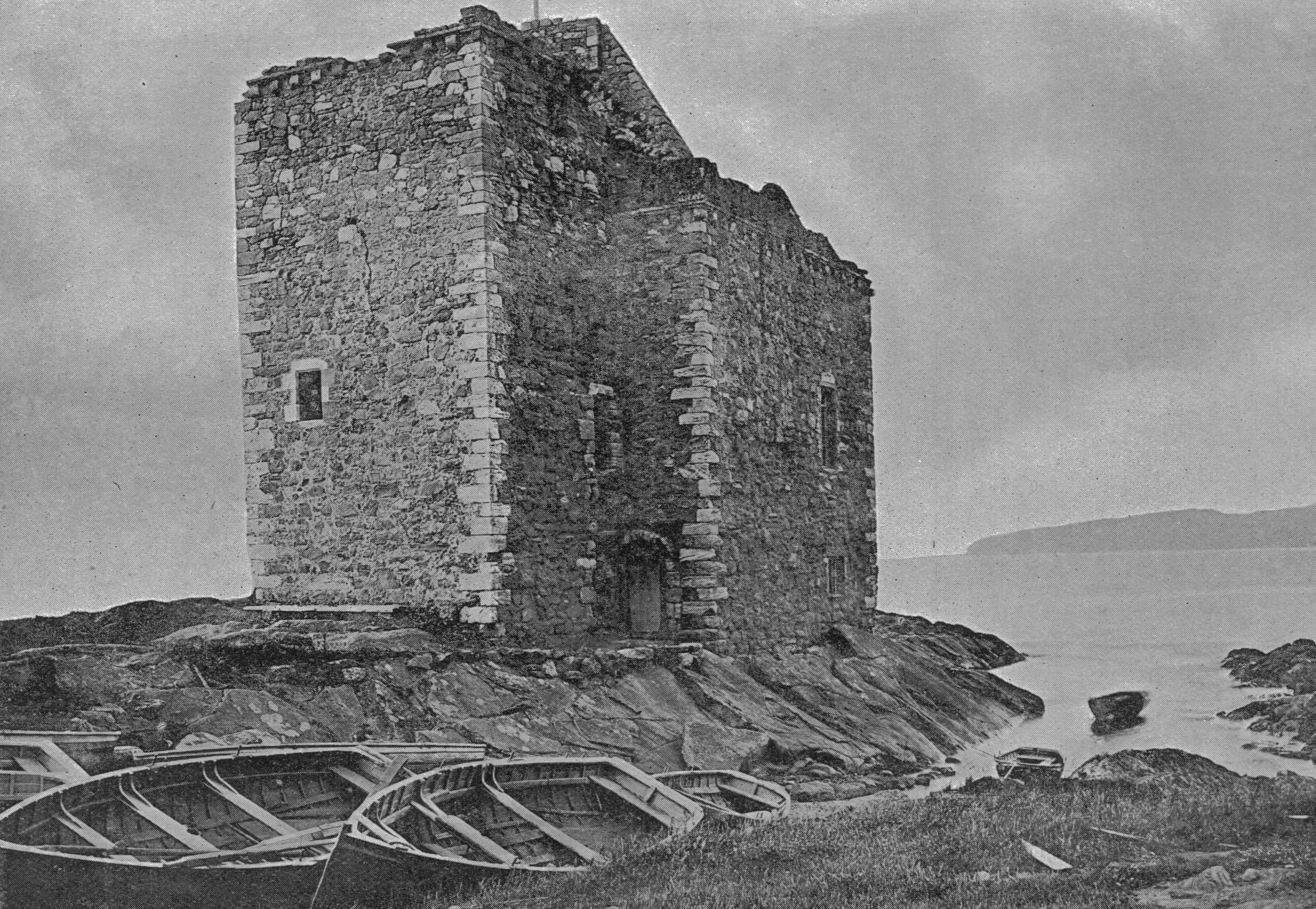
Portencross Castle circa 1900

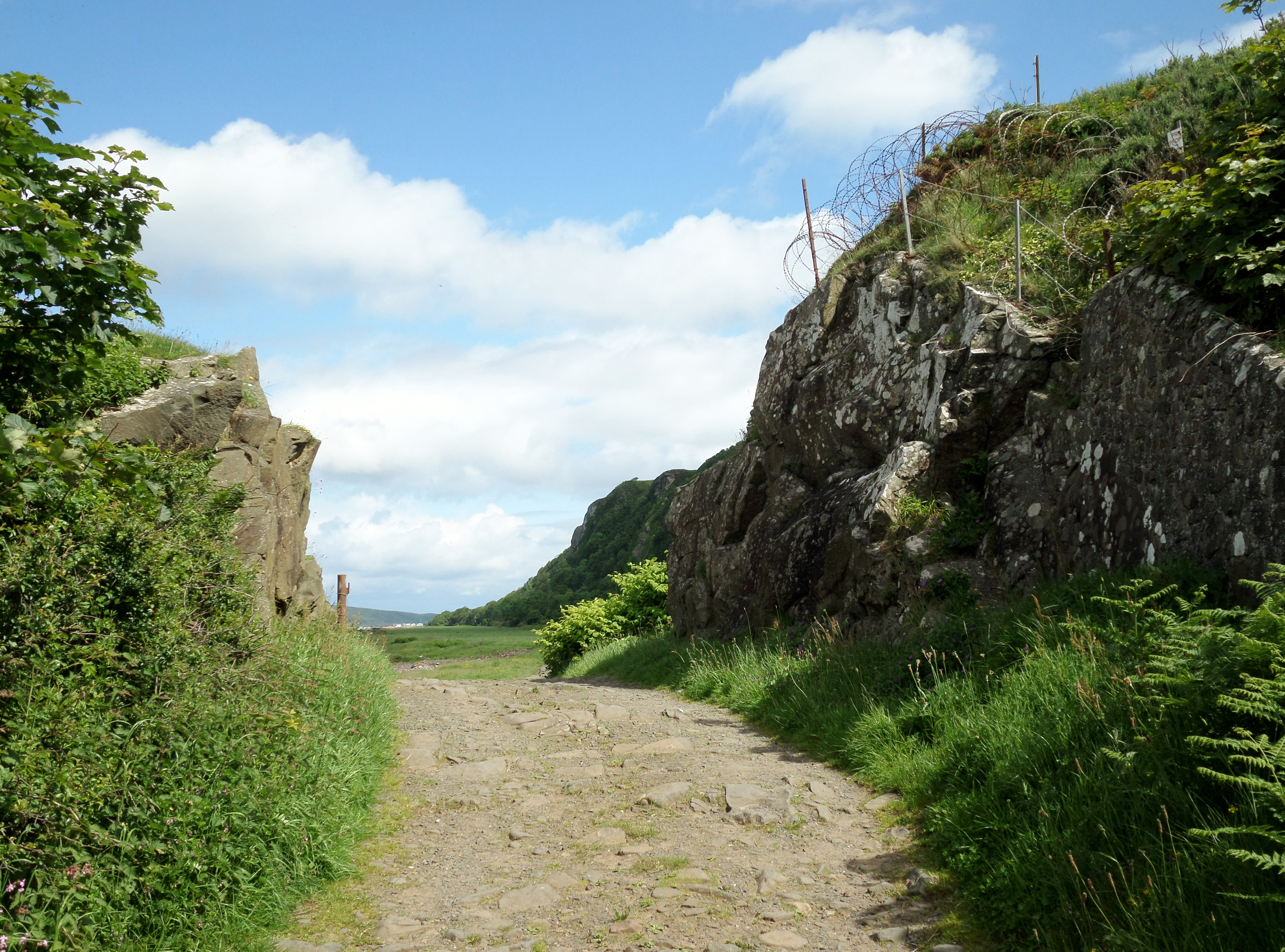
The "Throughlet" near Auchenames House and the pier (looking north)

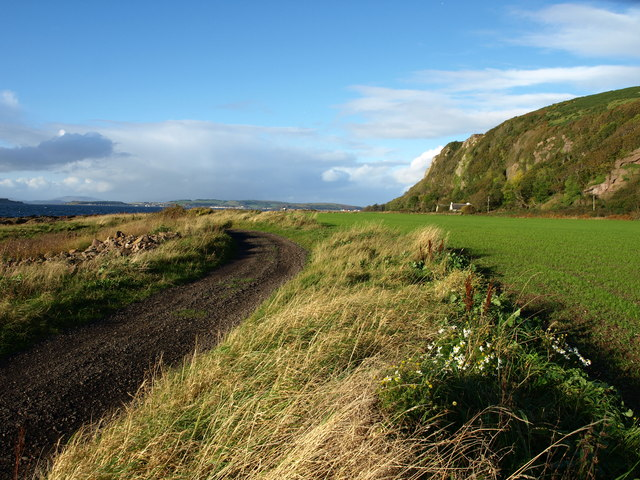
The Portencross to Hunterston coastal path (looking north)

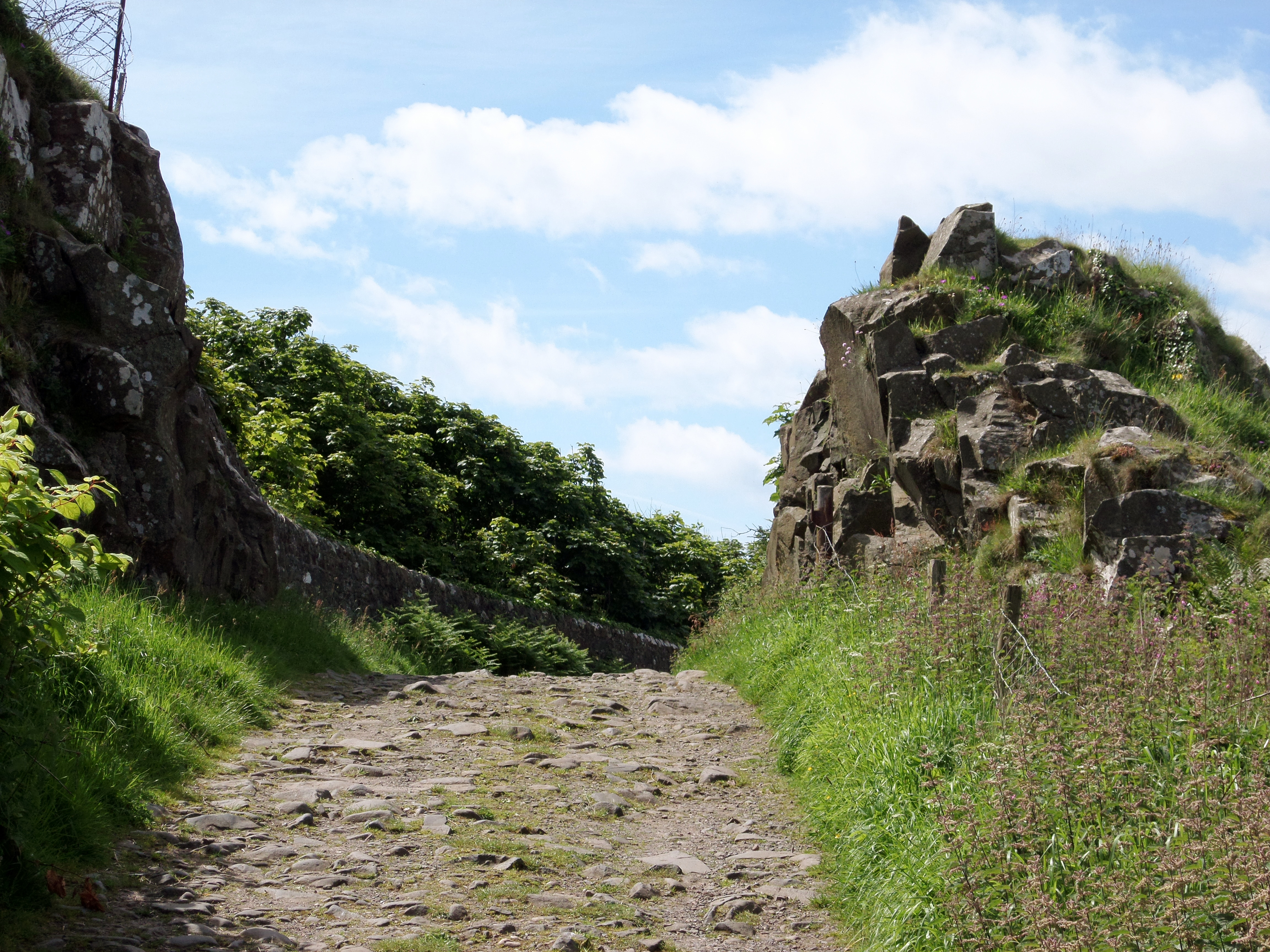
The "Throughlet" (looking south)

== Micro-history ==
It was thought by some that Alexander was involved in the murder as he hoped to marry the marginally younger and more attractive Mary, however given their respective ages this seems unlikely given average lifespan at the time. At the time it was certainly unusual for an attractive woman to remain unmarried and to live with her sister and brother-in-law for so many years. The author Jack House described the murder in his book Murder Not Proven. Postcards were sold showing Northbank Cottage with a policeman standing on guard duty outside and sold in thousands. Mary was the granddaughter of Margaret Gibson Spier who established Spier's school at Beith.

== See also ==
- Portencross Castle

== Sources ==
- Brown, Stephen (2018). Who Killed Mary Gunn?: Solving the Portencross Murder Mystery. CreateSpace Independent Publishing Platform. ISBN 978-198663373-4.
- "GUNN Mary". Ayrshire Roots.
- Hodgkinson, Alan (2002). West Kilbride, Seamill, Portencross & thereabouts. West Kilbride Amenity Society.
- House, Jack (1984). Murder Not proven. Glasgow: Richard Drew Publishing. pp. 112–134. ISBN 0-86267-065-9 – via Internet Archive.
- Kellie, John (2013). Ayrshire Echoes. Auchinleck: Carn Publishing. ISBN 978-0-9567550-5-6.
- Love, Dane (2003). Ayrshire: Discovering a County. Ayr: Fort Publishing. ISBN 0-9544461-1-9.
- "Mysterious Tragedy in Scotland. Woman Shot Dead". The Standard. 20 October 1913. p. 8 – via newspaperarchive.com.
- "Portencross Murder". River Clyde Photography. 2 November 2009. Archived from the original on 12 August 2014.
- "The Portencross Murder 100 years on". Ardrossan & Saltcoats Herald. 18 October 2013.
- "Scottish Murder Mystery. Police Baffled". The Standard. 27 October 1913. p. 9 – via newspaperarchive.com.
- "Soulsearchers". Archived from the original on 12 August 2014.
- "The Unknown Hand. Search For the Murderer Who Fired Into a Lonely Cottage". The Evening News. 20 October 1913. p. 5 – via newspaperarchive.com.
