= Greenlees Trophy =

Golf tournament in Scotland

The Greenlees Golf Trophy is competed for annually by the member golf clubs of the West of Scotland Ladies Inter Club League. The league has three divisions, currently of nine clubs each, and each club team comprises nine players. It is a match-play competition where handicaps are ignored, and game points are gained by clubs. All the clubs are affiliated to Scottish Golf governing body.

Division 1 winners are awarded the Greenlees Trophy, donated in 1931 by the husband of the League`s founder Ysobel Greenlees, Division 2 winners receive a Greenlees Cup awarded by Ysobel Greenlees in 1954 when that division first played, and Division 3 winners receive the Greenlees Shield, first played for in 1986. The results and division tables throughout each playing season are recorded online at Ladies Club Golf News around the West of Scotland.

== History ==
The League was founded by Ysobel Greenlees – a member of the Greenlees Scotch Whisky family - to encourage competitive golf for ladies on a scratch basis, and the first year 1930/31 was won by Prestwick St Nicholas. Ysobel Greenlees (née Findlay) was born in Glasgow in 1902 and brought up in Troon. She learned golf at Prestwick St Nicholas Golf Club, becoming Ladies Champion, before moving to Troon Ladies Golf Club.

Ysobel Greenlees became West of Scotland Ladies Champion in 1932, and became a regular member of the Scottish Ladies Team. She was a leading member of the first-ever international British Ladies Team which toured Australia and New Zealand, in 1935, playing en route in India; and captained Britain playing France in 1938, to success in France. From 1939, due to World War II, the League was suspended for ten years until 1949, when Troon won. She advertised in the Glasgow Herald inviting more clubs to join in – creating a second division in 1954, and a third division followed in 1986. She was a vivacious, powerful golfer, and when playing in the Open competitions newspapers reported “her golf gives more aesthetic pleasure to the spectator than any other of the competitors.”

== Organization ==
Each member club has a Greenlees secretary, and there is a West of Scotland secretary and committee. The member clubs as of 2015 are – Ayr Belleisle, Bothwell Castle, Cardross, Cathcart Castle, Cathkin Braes, Cawder, Cowglen, Douglas Park, Erskine, East Renfrewshire, Eastwood, Greenock, Haggs Castle, Hilton Park, Kilmacolm, Kilmarnock Barassie, Lanark, Largs, Lenzie, Loudon Gowf, Milngavie, Old Ranfurly, Prestwick St Nicholas, Ranfurly Castle, Troon Ladies, West Kilbride, Whitecraigs, and Williamwood. In 2015 the 75th Anniversary of Greenlees League competition was celebrated, with West of Scotland events being hosted by Cathcart Castle Golf Club, Clarkston.
