= Greenlee Partners =

Political lobbying firm in Pennsylvania

Greenlee Partners, LLC
- Type: Limited Liability Company
- Industry: Lobbying
- Founded: 1985
- Headquarters: 230 State Street; Harrisburg, Pennsylvania
- Key people: Bill Greenlee Founder (1938-2010); Stan Rapp Founder and Partner; Matt Steck Partner
- Website: http://www.greenleepartners.com/

Greenlee Partners, LLC is a lobbying firm in Pennsylvania, possibly best known for representing the City of Philadelphia and Allegheny County.

== Firm history ==
Greenlee Associates was founded in 1980 by Bill Greenlee, later changing its name to "Greenlee Partners" when Stan Rapp took charge in 2000. The firm is headquartered in Harrisburg, Pennsylvania, but represents clients all throughout Pennsylvania and Washington, D.C. The firm and its lobbyists were known for their connections to Pennsylvania Governor Tom Ridge's administration.

The firm produces a daily newsletter called “Harrisburg: ONLINE”, consisting of local, state, and national political activities with witty quip all throughout. In a 2002 article about the surprise resignation of Representative John E. Barley, the political analysis from Harrisburg: ONLINE was quoted in the Sunday News of Lancaster, Pennsylvania.

In 2009, the Pennsylvania Report called Greenlee Partners "the gold-standard" of lobbying firms in Pennsylvania. In a 1997 article about Pittsburgh Power & Light's lobbying presence in Harrisburg, the Pittsburgh Post-Gazette called Greenlee Partners a "powerhouse firm." The same description was used in another 1997 article about a charitable event hosted by members of the Harrisburg lobbying community. In a 1998 article about alleged "astroturf" lobbying efforts by AlliedSignal, The Philadelphia Inquirer called Greenlee "one of the capital's most visible lobbying firms." In a 1998 article about Greenlee's lobbying on behalf of the Pittsburgh Steelers and Pittsburgh Pirates, the Pittsburgh Post-Gazette called Greenlee "one of the best-known firms in Harrisburg."

The Dan Onorato administration credits Greenlee Partners with a "20-fold" return in the form of appropriations for a widening project on Pennsylvania Route 28, as well as a footbridge and security cameras at Duquesne University.

Greenlee Partners has been a community publisher to TheBurg News since its inception in 2009, advocating for lobbying reform and financial disclosure reform.

== Lobbying activities and issues ==
After the Pennsylvania House of Representatives was taken over by the Republicans in the 1990s, the City of Philadelphia hired Greenlee Partners to lobby the House on its behalf. Under that lobbying contract, Greenlee Partners was instrumental in passing a rental-car tax that helped fund Philadelphia's new stadiums, the airport expansion funding, and the one percent hotel tax that fuels the Greater Philadelphia Tourism Marketing Corporation.

In 2008, the Pittsburgh Tribune-Review questioned the necessity of the Port Authority of Allegheny County's lobbying contract with Greenlee Partners and raised questions about the propriety of Greenlee's relationship with House Transportation Committee Chairman Rick Geist.
