= Stan Rapp =

American lobbyist

Stanley I. Rapp
- Education: Penn State University

Stanley I. Rapp is a prominent lobbyist in Pennsylvania, where he is a partner with the Greenlee Partners lobbying firm, which is the "pre-eminent power player in Harrisburg politics." He is considered the "dean of Harrisburg lobbyists."

He earned a degree from Penn State University, and has worked as a political operative for a variety of federal, state, and local candidates. He worked in several positions in the Pennsylvania Senate, as Chief Clerk of the Pennsylvania Senate and as Chief of Staff to President Pro Tem Henry G. Hager.

The Pennsylvania Report named him to the 2003 "The Pennsylvania Report Power 75" list of influential figures in Pennsylvania politics, commenting on the strength of his connections to the Pennsylvania Senate. In 2009, the Pennsylvania Report named him to "The Pennsylvania Report 100" list of influential figures in Pennsylvania politics. He was named to the PoliticsPA list of "Sy Snyder's Power 50" list of influential individuals in Pennsylvania politics in 2002 and 2003. In 2010, Politics Magazine named him one of the most influential Republicans in Pennsylvania.
