= James Kennedy Logan =

James Kennedy Logan (8 May 1844–8 November 1912) was a New Zealand inspector and superintendent of telegraphs. He was born in West Kilbride, Ayrshire, Scotland on 8 May 1844.
