= Thomas Duncan Greenlees =

Scottish psychiatrist

Thomas Duncan Greenlees FRSE (29 September 1858 – 22 January 1929) was a Scottish psychiatrist who had a strong association with South Africa. He headed the Medical Association of South Africa for many years and was Inspector of Asylums for the Cape of Good Hope. He did much to promote the de-stigmatisation of insanity.

== Biography ==
He was born in Kilmarnock, Ayrshire, Scotland, the son of Dr Thomas Greenlees of Ballantrae. He studied medicine at the University of Edinburgh, graduating with an MB ChB in 1882. He chiefly concerned himself with psychological aspects of health.

He worked in the City of London Asylum at Stone (1882–1884) and at Carlisle Asylum (1884–1887) and Dartford Asylum (1887–1890). Then in 1890 he obtained a post as Medical Superintendent of the Grahamstown Asylum (now Fort England Psychiatric Hospital) in the Cape Colony. He remained there until 1908. He held a secondary post at Grahamstown Chronic Sick Hospital.

He was elected a fellow of the Royal Society of Edinburgh in 1897. His proposers were Alexander Edington, Henry Barnes, W Campbell, and Sir William Turner. He received his doctorate (MD) in 1901. In the First World War he served as a Major in the Royal Army Medical Corps, acting as Commanding Officer of the Weymouth Military Hospital.

In later years, he worked at Fenstanton Asylum, a private home in Streatham Hill. During this period he lived in Fordingbridge.

He retired in 1922 to St Leonards-on-Sea on the south coast of England and died there following a short illness on 22 January 1929. He was the father of writer Duncan Greenlees.

== Publications ==
- "A Contribution to the Study of Diseases of the Circulatory System in the Insane. (The Essay to which the £10 10s. prize of the Association was awarded)". The British Journal of Psychiatry. 31 (135): 327–355. 1885. doi:10.1192/bjp.31.135.327. ISSN 0007-1250.
- "Insanity Among the Natives of South Africa". The Lancet. 145 (3730): 498–499. 1895. doi:10.1016/S0140-6736(01)62119-6. ISSN 0140-6736.
