= Bill Greenlee =

American lobbyist in Pennsylvania

William D. "Bill" Greenlee (February 1, 1938 – September 30, 2010) was an American lobbyist based in Pennsylvania.

Greenlee first worked on political campaigns with William Scranton's 1962 campaign for Pennsylvania Governor. He worked on the staff of several legislators in the Pennsylvania House of Representatives. He was campaign manager for several Congressional campaigns and three successful statewide referendums. He worked as a lobbyist for a Philadelphia law firm. In 1980, he founded the Greenlee Partners lobbying firm.

In 2002, he was named to the "Sy Snyder's Power 50" by PoliticsPA. In 2003, Greenlee was named to the PoliticsPA "Power 50" list of politically influential people in Pennsylvania. He was named to the 2009 "PA Report 100" by the Pennsylvania Report.

Greenlee retired from active lobbying in 2002. He died on September 30, 2010.
