= Seamill =

Village in North Ayrshire on the west coast of Scotland

Coordinates: 55°41′N 4°52′W

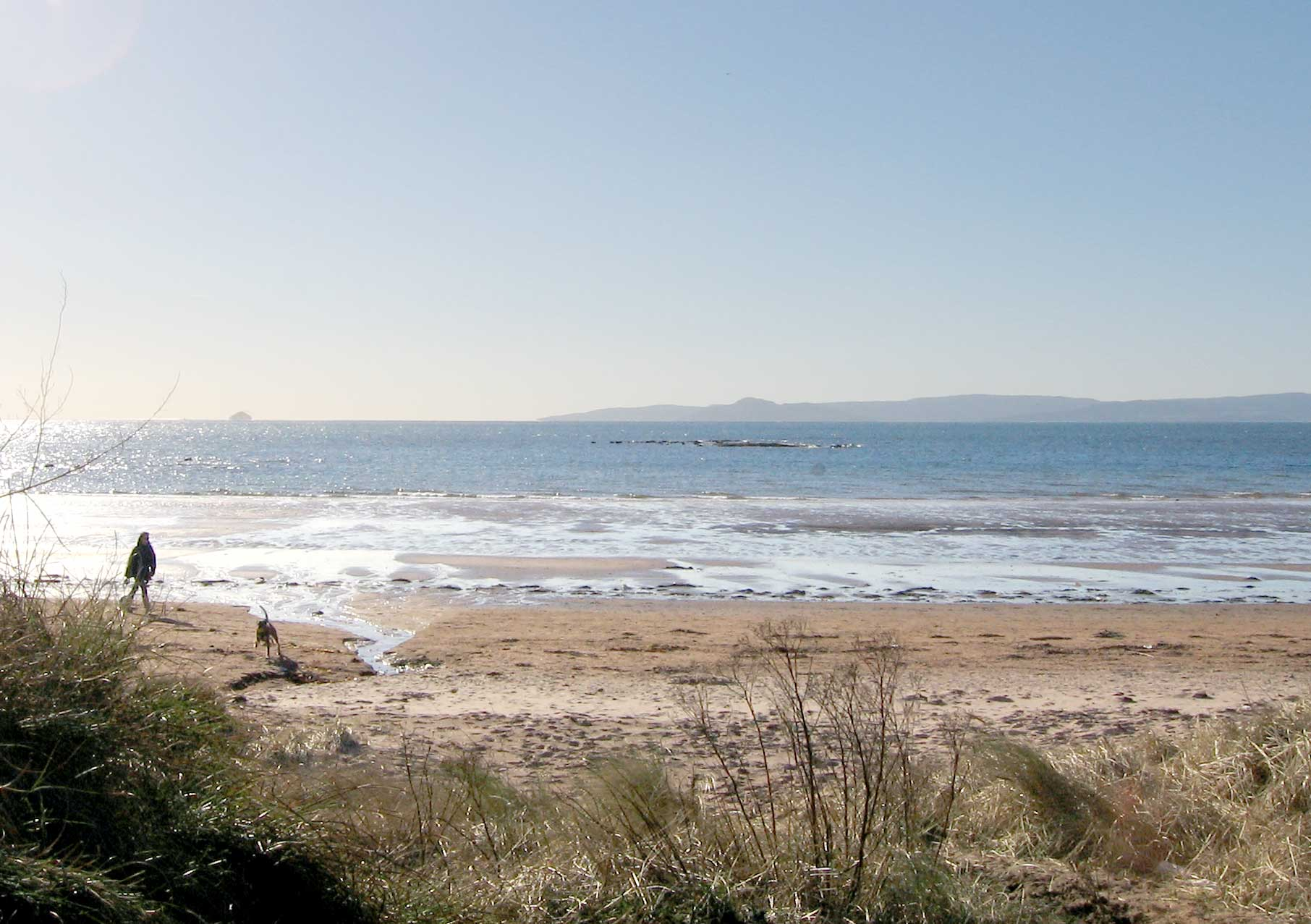
from Seamill beach, looking south-west over the lower Firth of Clyde towards the southern part of Arran and Ailsa Craig.

Seamill is a village in North Ayrshire on the west coast of Scotland, about 5 miles north of Ardrossan and 8 miles south of Largs, on the east coast of the Firth of Clyde.

It is sometimes considered part of West Kilbride, and sometimes considered as a village in its own right. The local authority has sought to consolidate it with West Kilbride by signposting it as "West Kilbride incorporating Seamill", however its location on the major A78 trunk road (West Kilbride proper is bypassed) means that it is still locally identified as an entity in its own right.

It is named after one of its oldest buildings, the Sea Mill, a grain watermill that appears in Johannes Blaeu's Atlas of Scotland published in Amsterdam in 1654. Seamill village has a golf club known as West Kilbride Golf Club, with a putting practice green and a course with eighteen holes.

It also has a hotel called the Seamill Hydro which has a swimming pool. The Seamill Hydro first opened in 1880, during the boom period of hydropathic establishments. These commenced as mostly as therapeutic establishments, but over time morphed into hotel format, with Seamill Hydro being one of the few such surviving facilities from that era.

== See also ==
- Portencross
