= Hunterston =

Coastal area in Ayrshire, Scotland

Coordinates: 55.7253°N 4.8803°W

Hunterston, by the Firth of Clyde, is a coastal area in Ayrshire, Scotland. It is the seat and estate of the Hunter family. As an area of flat land adjacent to deep natural water, it has been the site of considerable actual and proposed industrial development in the 20th century. The nearest town is West Kilbride. The Hunterston Brooch was found there.

Actual or proposed developments on this site have included:

- Hunterston A nuclear power station, the closed Magnox power station
- Hunterston B nuclear power station, the shut-down Advanced gas-cooled reactor power station
- Western HVDC Link, the 2.2 GW undersea power cable to Flintshire Bridge, North Wales
- Hunterston Terminal, the deep-water ore terminal and associated railhead built by British Steel
- A construction yard, used to build oil platforms between 1978 and 1983, a Trident dry dock between 1988 and 1993 and a Gravity base Tank between 1993 and 1996
- A proposed Oil Refinery by Chevron in 1969 and 1973
- An integrated direct-reduction steel blast furnace proposed by British Steel Corporation. This was unused as its gas and fuel requirements were too great. The plant was moved to Mobile, Alabama, in 1998.
- A "clean coal" power station has been proposed for the site. Peel Energy is the main partner in the proposal. However, the plan was said to have "collapsed" in 2009 after £2 billion of financial backing from DONG Energy was withdrawn.

== Trident Works Programme ==
A covered floating dry dock for the Vanguard-class submarines was built at Hunterston, and floated to RNAD Coulport where it has been situated since 1993. This Explosive Handling Jetty is one of the world's largest floating concrete structures.
