= West Kilbride =

Village in North Ayrshire, Scotland

Coordinates: 55.6966°N 04.8576°W

West Kilbride: Scottish Gaelic: Cille Bhrìghde an Iar
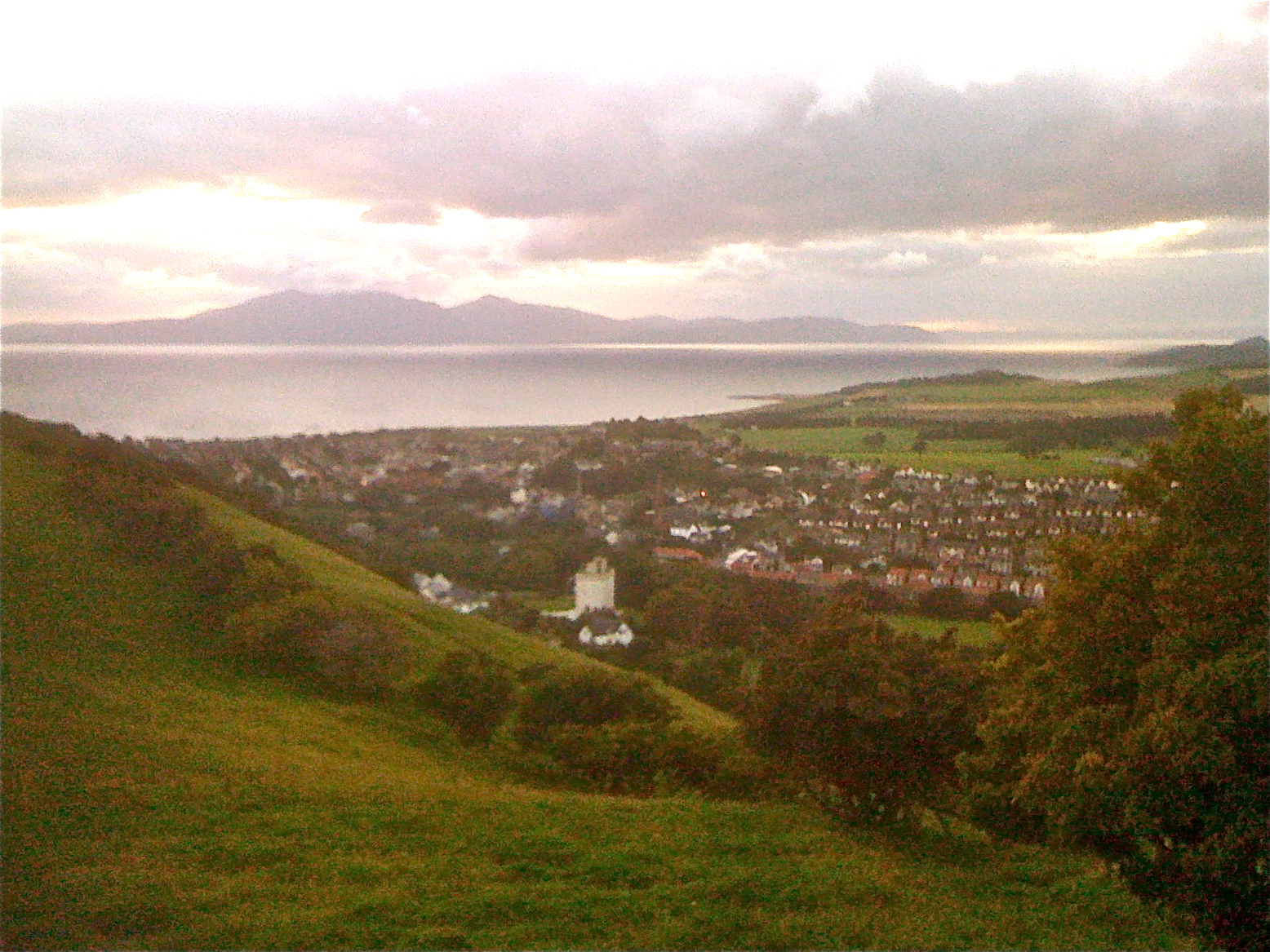
- West Kilbride from Law Hill

- Location within North Ayrshire
- Population: 4,860 (2020)
- OS grid reference: NS205485
- Council area: North Ayrshire
- Lieutenancy area: Ayrshire and Arran
- Country: Scotland
- Sovereign state: United Kingdom
- Post town: WEST KILBRIDE
- Postcode district: KA23
- Dialling code: 01294
- Police: Scotland
- Fire: Scottish
- Ambulance: Scottish
- UK Parliament: North Ayrshire and Arran
- Scottish Parliament: Cunninghame North

West Kilbride ( Scottish Gaelic: Cille Bhrìghde an Iar) is a small town and historic parish in North Ayrshire, Scotland, on the west coast by the Firth of Clyde, looking across the Firth of Clyde to Goat Fell and the Isle of Arran. West Kilbride and adjoining districts of Seamill and Portencross are generally considered to be a small town, having a combined population of 4,393 at the 2001 census.

== History ==
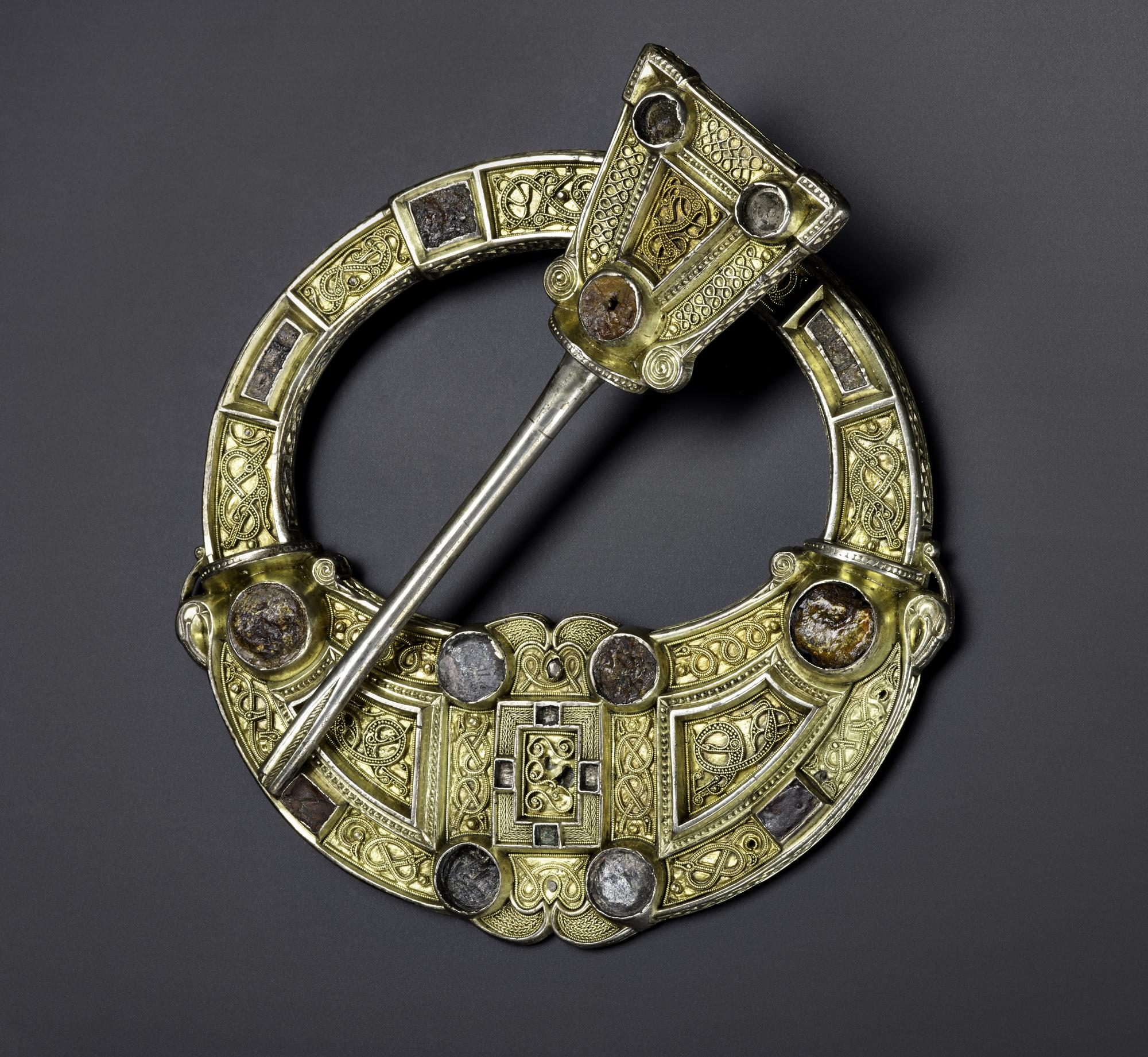
The brooch is a casting of silver, mounted with gold, silver and amber decoration.

=== Early history ===
A Neolithic cup and ring marked stone is located on Blackshaw Hill, near West Kilbride. This stone is unusual, in that it is carved with three spirals. Although the purpose of such stones is not known, it is considered that they may have had religious importance. Traces of an Iron Age fortification were uncovered when the house named "The Fort" was constructed in Ardrossan Road, Seamill.

=== Celtic ===
West Kilbride is generally believed to be named after the ancient Celtic Saint Brigid of Kildare, often known as St Bride. The name suggests there was once a cell or kil to Brigid in the area, although local legend has her visit to establish her church around 500 AD (the landing point was supposedly in front of the now Seamill Hydro). The "West" prefix was added in the early 18th century to distinguish between another Kilbride in South Lanarkshire. There has been a hamlet in the area since 82 AD when the Roman general Agricola stationed 30,000 troops in the area of the village now known as Gateside. Roman roads can still be explored around the village to this day, and many Roman finds have been reported and lodged in Museums throughout Scotland. William Wallace's uncle Crauford had an estate at Corsbie in the North of the village, and this is still in use as a caravan park called Crosby, to this day (Wallace's mother's family). In later years Robert the Bruce gave a grant of the lands of the Barony of Kilbride to the Boyds of Kilmarnock. It was once home to various mills and other works, and in the 18th century West Kilbride was primarily a weaving village.

In 1826, the Hunterston Brooch, a highly important Celtic brooch of "pseudo-penannular" type was found by two men from West Kilbride who were digging drains at the foot of Goldenberry Hill, near Hunterston. Made about 700 AD, the Hunterston Brooch is cast in silver, gilt, and gold, silver and amber, and decorated with interlaced animal bodies in gold filigree. In its centre, a cross and a golden Glory represent the Risen Christ. The Hunterston Brooch is clearly object of very high status, indicating the power and great prestige of its owner. Nowadays, it is considered one of the most significant items of Celtic art, and is housed in the Royal Museum of Scotland, Edinburgh.

=== Medieval ===
Several buildings in the area date back to medieval times. Law Castle, situated at the foot of Law Hill, was built in the 15th century for King James III's sister Mary. The castle is a simple rectangular structure with a sloping roof and several large chimneys protruding at each side. In recent years, Law Castle has been substantially restored and refurbished and it now letted for functions and as a holiday home.

Portencross Castle, thought to date from the 14th century, is situated right next to the sea at Portencross harbour. It is L-shaped and four storeys high, with a barrel-vaulted ceiling. The castle was roofless for many years due to storm damage. A campaign to save Portencross Castle from private ownership received national publicity in July 2004 when it was featured on the BBC's Restoration television programme. The title for the castle and grounds was given to the group "Friends of Portencross Castle" on 22 December 2005.

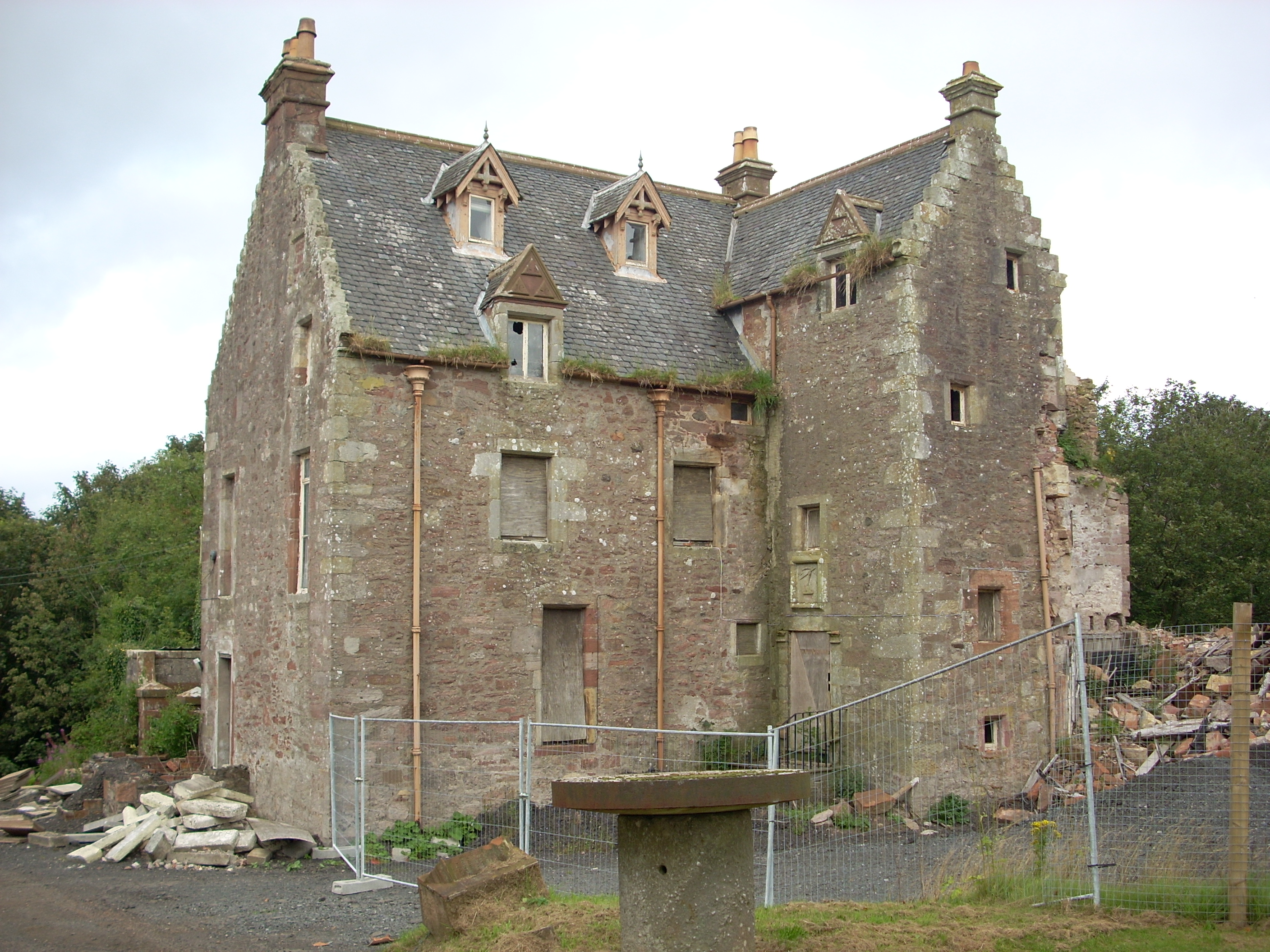
Crosbie Castle

Crosbie Castle (also known as Crosbie Towers) lies to the north east on the outskirts of West Kilbride. It was largely rebuilt from a tower demolished in the 17th century which was the home of Sir Ranald Craufurd (uncle of William Wallace) in the 13th century, and it is said that Wallace himself spent some time at Crosbie. Currently the castle lies at the centre of a caravan park also called Crosbie Towers. Having lain empty for a number of years due to internal fire damage, part of the building was demolished in early 2007 after heavy storms damaged the external walls of the castle. Although the building is a Category-B listed building, permission was not sought before demolition.

=== Early modern ===
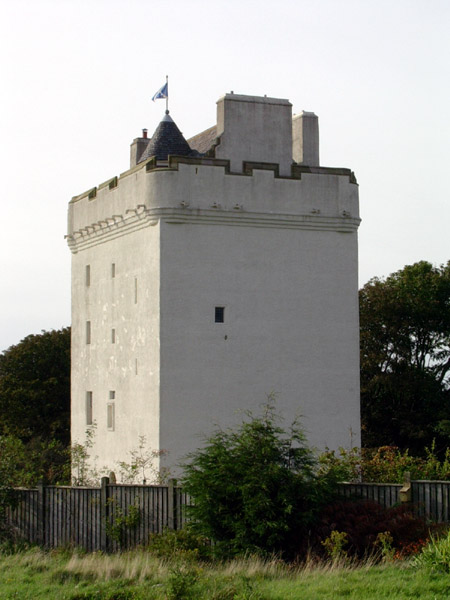
Law Castle

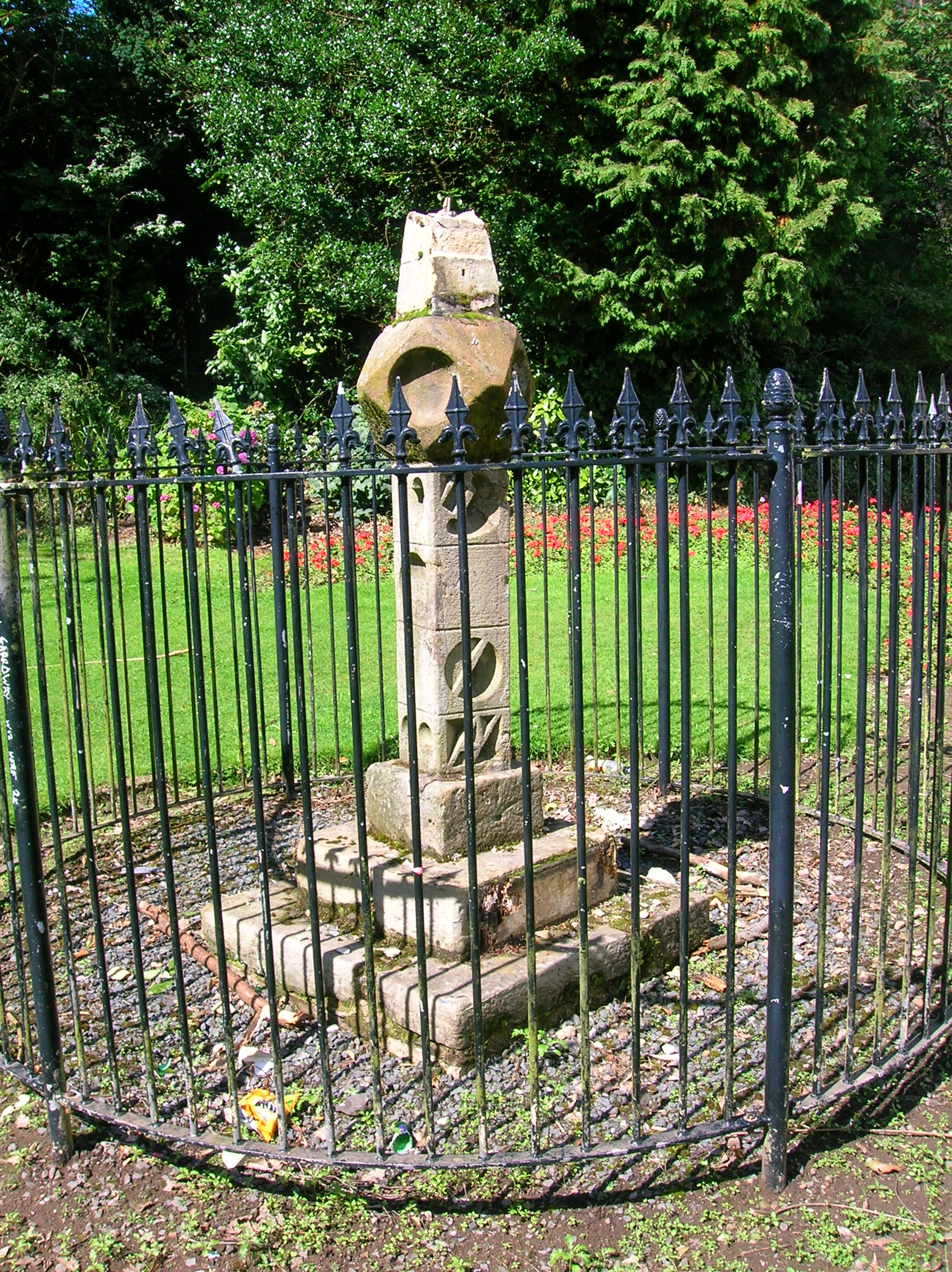
West Kilbride's Scottish Sundial

The town became known as a weaving and agricultural town, one of many Ayrshire towns specialising in potatoes. Since the town became linked by rail to Glasgow in 1878, it began to attract more visitors, particularly to the Hydropathic spa at Seamill and its neighbouring sandy beach.

== Governance ==
West Kilbride is governed by North Ayrshire Council as part of the unitary local authority of North Ayrshire and Arran based in Irvine, which controls such matters as education, environmental services and social housing. Police services are operated by Police Scotland. The Scottish Parliament is responsible for policy on devolved matters such as education, health and justice while reserved matters are dealt with by the Parliament of the United Kingdom.

West Kilbride forms part of the constituency of North Ayrshire and Arran, electing one Member of Parliament (MP) to the House of Commons of the United Kingdom. Katy Clark of the Labour Party was elected in 2005 and re-elected in 2010 with a 47.4% share of the vote. For Scottish Parliament elections, West Kilbride forms part of the Cunninghame North constituency, which elected SNP candidate Kenny Gibson to Holyrood in 2007 with 30.7% of the vote. Gibson was re-elected in 2011 with 52.6% of the vote, a majority of 6,117. West Kilbride is also represented by seven regional MSPs from the West of Scotland electoral region.

See also:

- North Ayrshire (UK Parliament constituency) (1868–1918)
- Bute and Northern Ayrshire (UK Parliament constituency) (1918–1983)
- Cunninghame North (UK Parliament constituency) (1983–2005)

== Geography ==
West Kilbride is situated on the west coast of Scotland, approximately 40 miles (60 kilometres) southwest of Glasgow, about 8 mi (13 km) south of Largs and about 5 mi (8 km) north of the "Three Towns" conurbation of Ardrossan, Saltcoats and Stevenston. The built-up area extends from Seamill on the coast of the Firth of Clyde to the principal part of the town, which, raised up and about 1 mi (1.5 km) from the coast, lies between Law Hill (168 m or 551 ft) and Tarbert Hill (138 m or 453 ft). It is overlooked by Cauldron Hill (329 m or 1,079 ft), whose name is largely reputed to be from the Welsh "Cadron" ref. Geoffrey of Monmouth. It looks across the Firth of Clyde to the mountains of the Isle of Arran to the west. The seafront at Seamill features a long sandy beach, as well as rocky outcrops including the small harbour at Portencross. The neighbouring agricultural land supports cereals, potatoes, and livestock, particularly sheep.

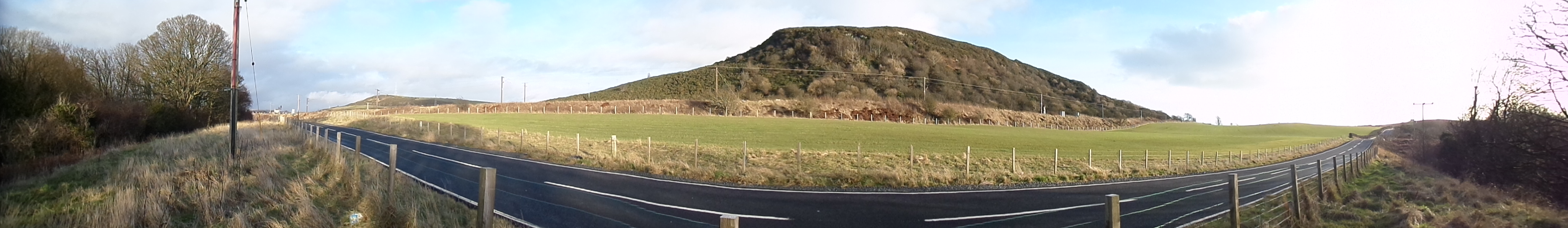
Tarbert Hill

== Demography ==
At the 2001 census, the population of West Kilbride was 4,393. Approximately 85% were born in Scotland, and 10.6% were born in England. Compared to the population of Scotland as a whole, the number of children aged 5–15 is above average, as is the proportion of adults age 45+. 2.2% of the community were born outside Europe. 77% of residents own their home, compared to 62.6% in the population as a whole; 34.3 live in detached houses compared to 20.4 in all of Scotland, and the proportion of semi-detached dwellings is also above average.

== Economy ==
=== Work and employment ===
The local area is predominantly rural, but agriculture accounts for only 1.4% of local employment. Managers and professional occupations make up 33.7% of the employed population, compared to the average of 23.8% for the whole of Scotland.

The main industries of employment at the 2001 census were:

Industry	% of employed population
Health and social work	14.6%
Manufacturing	11.8%
Real estate and renting and business activities	11.3%
Wholesale & retail trade and repairs	10.3%
Education	9.6%

=== Farming and local industry ===
The area is noted for its Ayrshire potatoes. These grow well locally, thanks to the use as fertiliser of the abundant supply of seaweed conveniently deposited on the nearby shore by winter storms. For this reason West Kilbride was sometimes referred to as the "Tattie Toon". Other crops grown include sweetcorn (for cattle food), barley, root vegetables and summer berries, especially strawberries. Cattle and sheep are also farmed locally.

Industries close to the village include the Hunterston B nuclear power station and the nearby Hunterston Terminal, owned by Clydeport. A 24 MW wind farm, owned and operated by Airtricity, is located on Busbie Muir (about 3 km east of Tarbert Hill), and has been operational since February 2004. Its capacity will increase to 30 MW when three additional wind turbines become operational, scheduled for Autumn 2007.

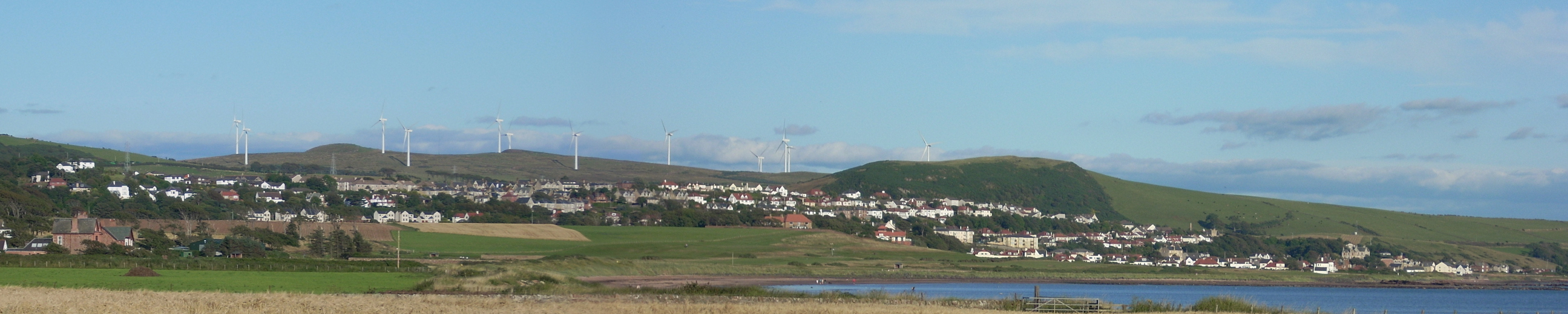
A view of the twelve wind turbines above West Kilbride and Seamill

=== Crafts ===
Through the endeavours of the local initiative group, West Kilbride is now achieving fame as the "Craft Town Scotland". The village boasts a number of craft shops and studios. The Barony Craft Centre provides a convenient way for craftspeople to sell their art and craftwork, in return for a share of the profits. In September 2006, West Kilbride Craft Town won the Department of Trade and Industry's "Enterprising Britain 2006" competition. Presenting the award, Alistair Darling MP praised the resourcefulness and dedication of the West Kilbride community.

In January 2012 the Craft Town Scotland project achieved another accolade by winning the Creative Scotland £100k "Creative Places" award. The £1.7m Barony Craft Centre was formally opened to the public on 1 May 2012. This is now the centrepiece of this extensive community initiative. The West Kilbride Community Initiative is currently considering how to further strengthen the project, and this may be to consider the renovation of Kirtonhall.

== Culture ==
=== Festivals and public events ===
==== Yuletide Night ====
Held on the first Friday of December every year, this is a Christmas event where shops open late as a procession of children and adults follow Santa to the village hall. Music, stalls and children's fairground rides are set up on Main Street and adjoining Glen Road, which are closed to traffic for the evening.

==== Scarecrow Festival ====
West Kilbride is the first town in Scotland to organise an annual "Scarecrow Festival". The purpose of the Scarecrow Festival is to foster community spirit and civic pride within West Kilbride and its surrounding area. It celebrates West Kilbride's origins as an agricultural community, while looking to the future through the "Craft Town Scotland" initiative.

=== Sport ===
West Kilbride Golf Club, a championship links course, is situated at Fullerton Drive, Seamill. The original designer of the course was Old Tom Morris. The club hosted the Millennium British Ladies' Championship, and hosts the Scottish Boys' Championship once every three years.

West Kilbride Bowling Club, located on Weston Terrace, has two bowling greens.

West Kilbride Amateur Football Club were formed in 1947 and compete in the Ayrshire Amateur Football League. Team colours are amber and black and home matches are currently played at Kirktonhall Glen.

West Kilbride Tennis Club was formed in 2016 following completion of the refurbishment of the Tennis Courts in Kirktonhall Glen.

== Landmarks ==
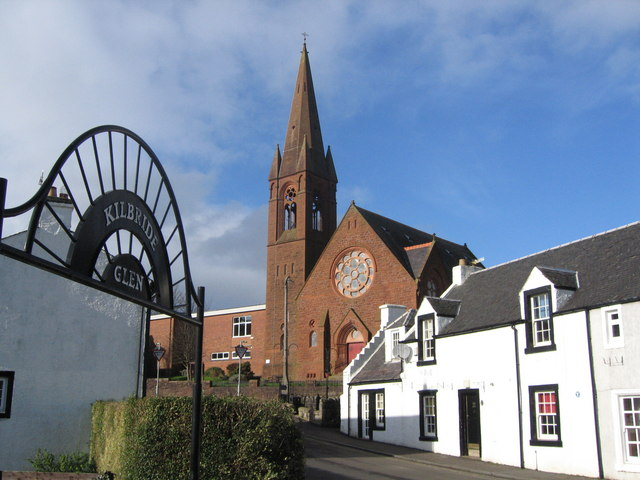
St Andrew's Church

St. Andrew's church, formerly known as St. Brides, belongs to the Church of Scotland. It has a large rose stained glass window and a tall, gothic bell tower.

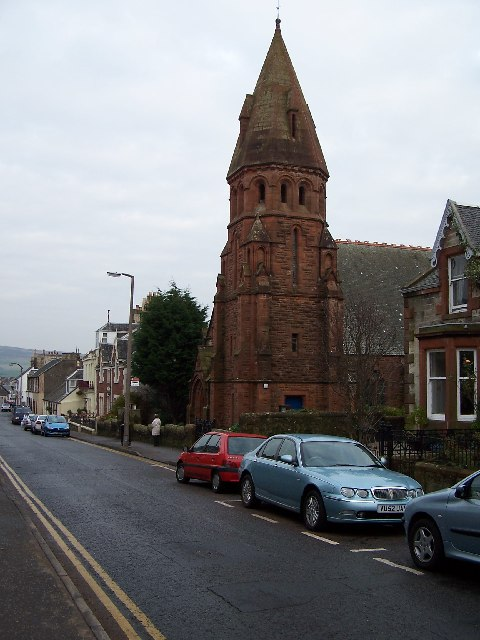
Overton Church

Overton Church, also belonging to the Church of Scotland, is located at the top of Ritchie Street. It is a red sandstone building with a working bell tower.

St. Bride's is a small Roman Catholic chapel, on the north side of Hunterston Road, with a large garden behind it.

The Barony (or Barony Church), a large 19th-century grey sandstone building, is situated just across the main street from St. Andrew's. This building no longer functions as a church; however, it remains in public hands, as the new £1.7m Craft Exhibition Centre operated by Craft Town Scotland (a project of the West Kilbride Community Initiative Limited).

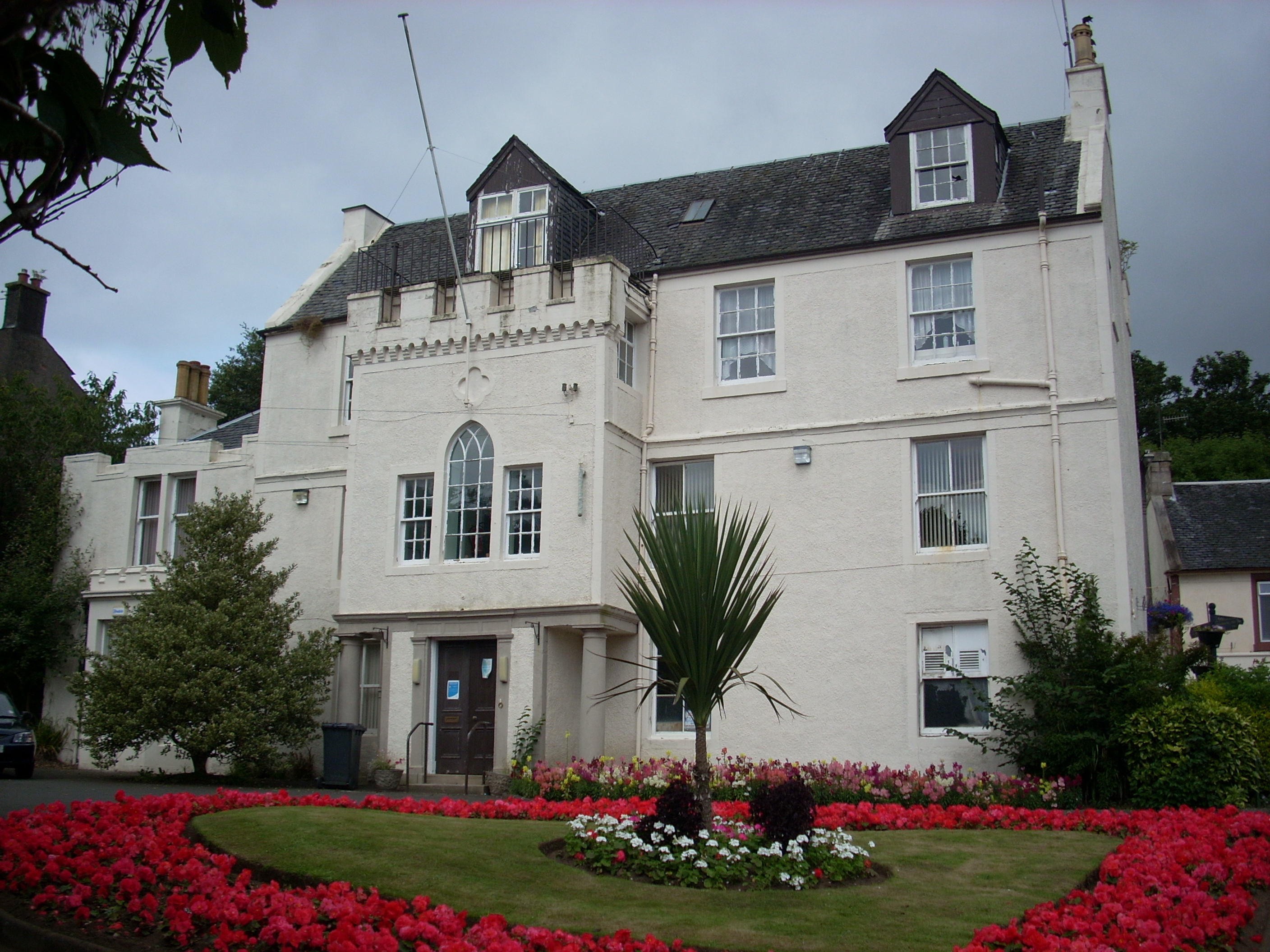
Kirktonhall House

One of the oldest houses in West Kilbride is Kirktonhall, which originally dates back to 1660, although the house was partially rebuilt and extended in 1791 and 1868. The house was birthplace to mathematician Robert Simson, born 14 October 1687. A large monument to Simson stands in West Kilbride's cemetery. Kirktonhall was formally used as administrative offices by North Ayrshire Council but now remains boarded up.

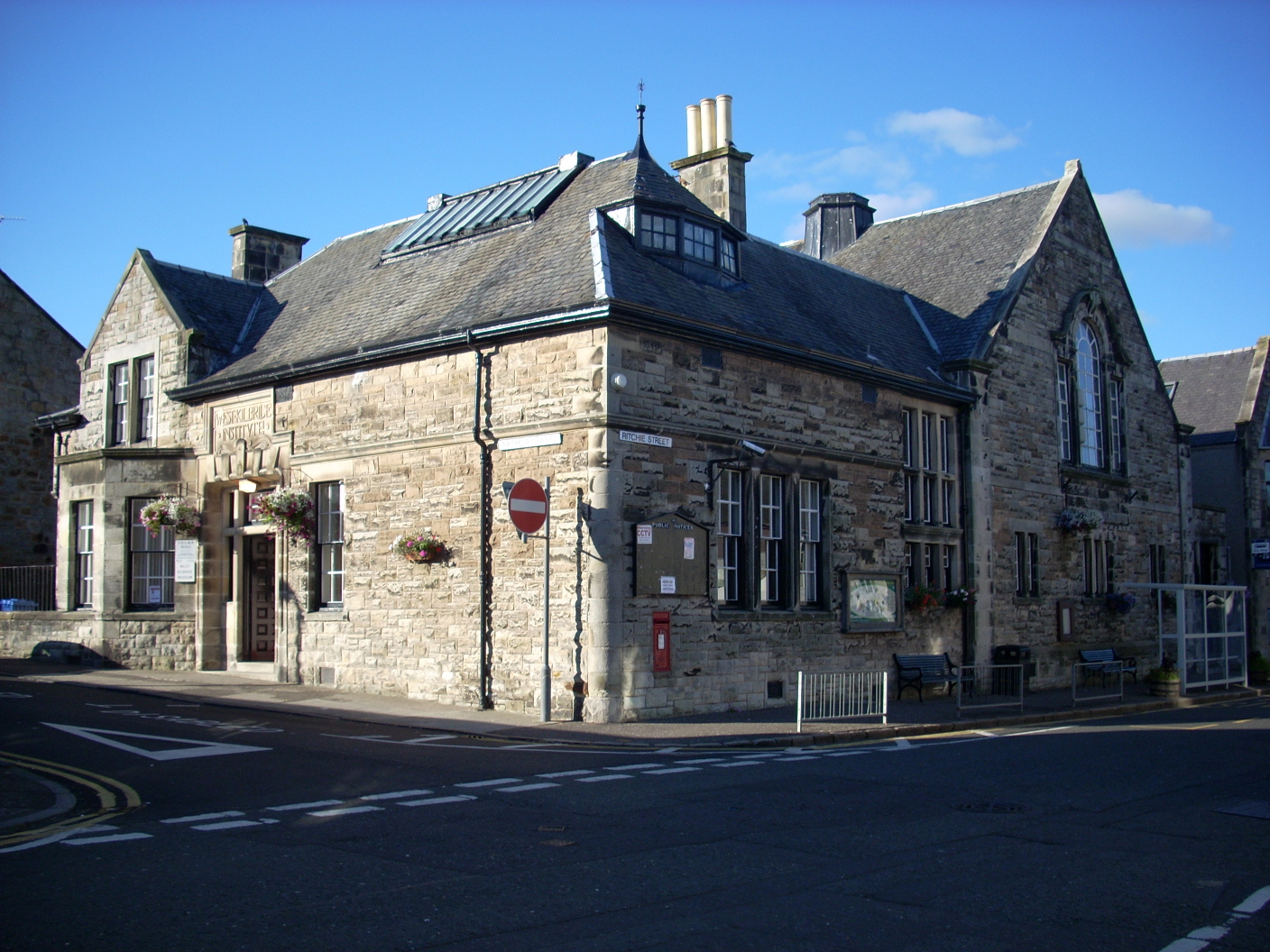
West Kilbride Village Hall

The West Kilbride Institute and Public Hall, opened in 1900, has been home to the West Kilbride Horticultural Society's flower shows from the same year. The building currently has a number of other uses, including a permanent local history museum, located on the first floor of the hall. The local library was housed here until 1996 when a dedicated home was built (see below). Since the late 1990s the Hall has been run by a dedicated Management Group as part of the highly successful West Kilbride Community Initiative. It is hoped that during 2012 with the full support of the Initiative and local Council the Hall will proceed to separate charitable status as a SCIO.

The War Memorial, originally built in 1921, did not list the names of the dead. This deficiency was remedied on 3 June 2001 (the Sunday nearest D-Day), when the memorial was re-dedicated with four new granite stones listing the names.

Kirktonhall Glen is a woodland walkway leading from West Kilbride to Seamill, gifted to West Kilbride in 1924 by Robert Barr.

== Education ==
West Kilbride Primary School serves West Kilbride, Seamill and Portencross. Opened in 1983, it replaced the previous Victorian-era school which had burned down in 1980 on the same site. The original school could support up to 250 pupils. The newer school has exactly 465 pupils.

The community centre in Corse Street houses many local groups and organisations including bridge, photo, snooker and music clubs, the local cub scouts, computer classes, yoga classes, and the North Ayrshire Music School. This building was originally the Paisley Convalescent Home, gifted by James Arthur of Carlung. Opened in the 19th century, it much later became a community centre and now.

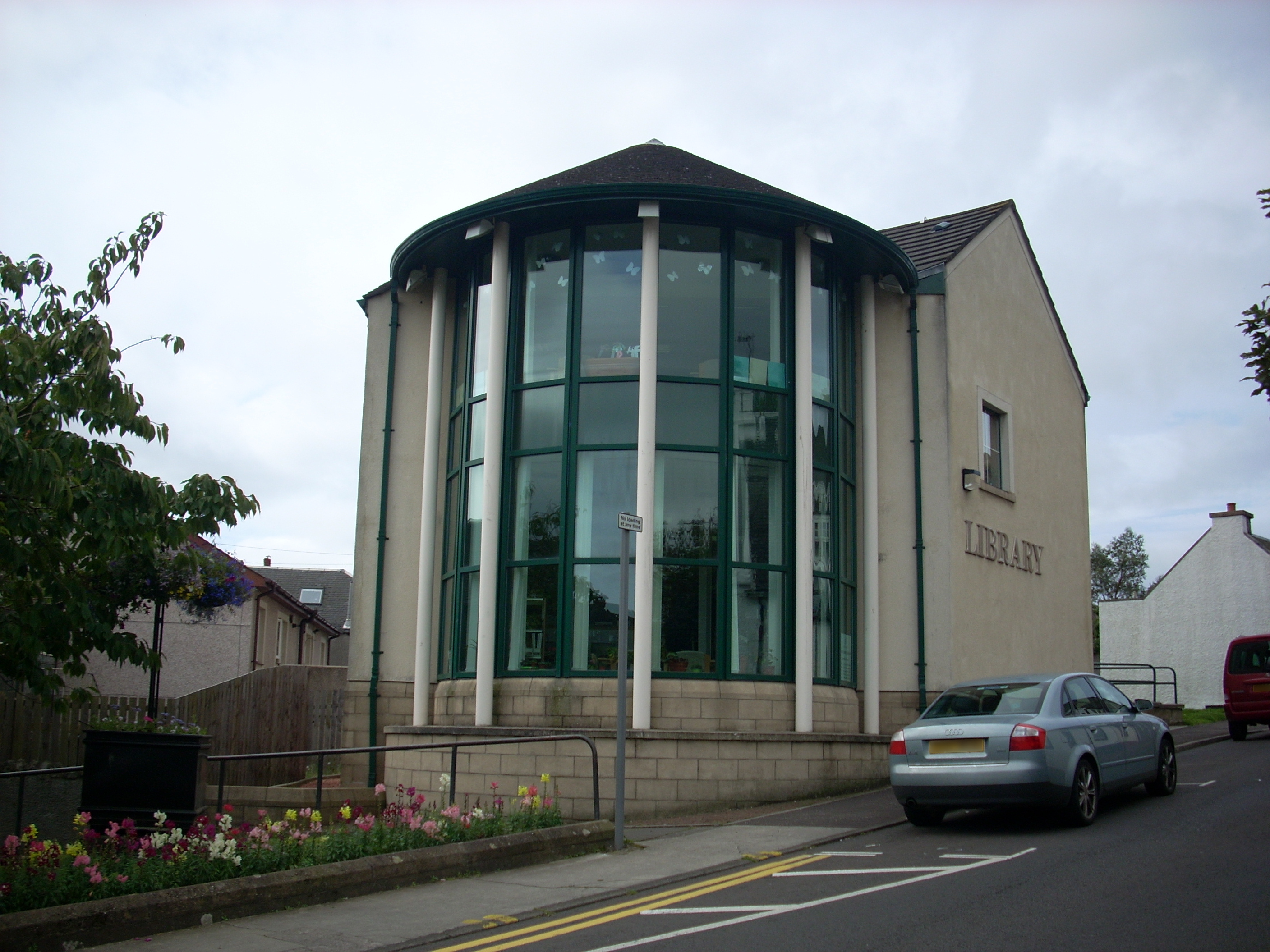
West Kilbride Library

The town's library, opened in 1996, was purpose-built to replace the library originally located in the village hall and is located at the fork of Main Street and Halfway Street. The library is run by North Ayrshire Council.

== Transport ==
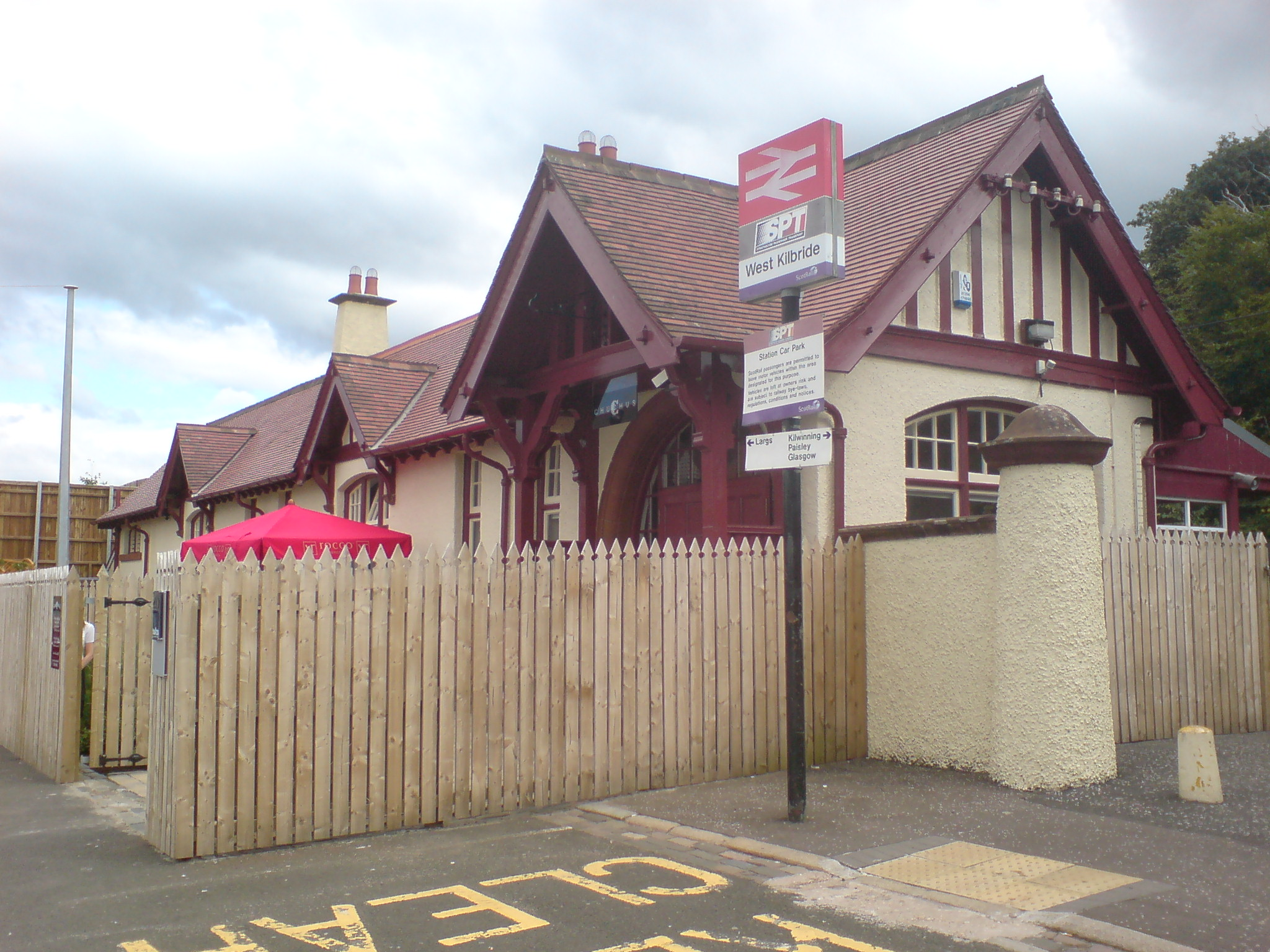
The former station building at West Kilbride railway station.

=== Rail ===
West Kilbride railway station lies on the Ayrshire Coast Line between Largs and Glasgow Central. The journey to Glasgow takes around 50 minutes. The station is unmanned, with only one passenger track.

=== Bus ===
A bus service connects West Kilbride northwards to Largs and south to Ayr. The service is number 585, and is operated by the Stagecoach Group. Buses run approximately half-hourly; there is no bus station but there are several roadside bus stops throughout the town.

=== Road ===
The main A78 road links West Kilbride to as far as Greenock to the north, and Prestwick to the South. The B781 road links West Kilbride to Dalry (and beyond to Glasgow via the A737) in the east. There are half-hourly buses northwards to Largs, and southwards to Ardrossan, Saltcoats, Stevenston, Irvine and Ayr. There is also a commuter bus service to Glasgow, the journey taking around 1 hour 35 minutes.

== Notable residents ==
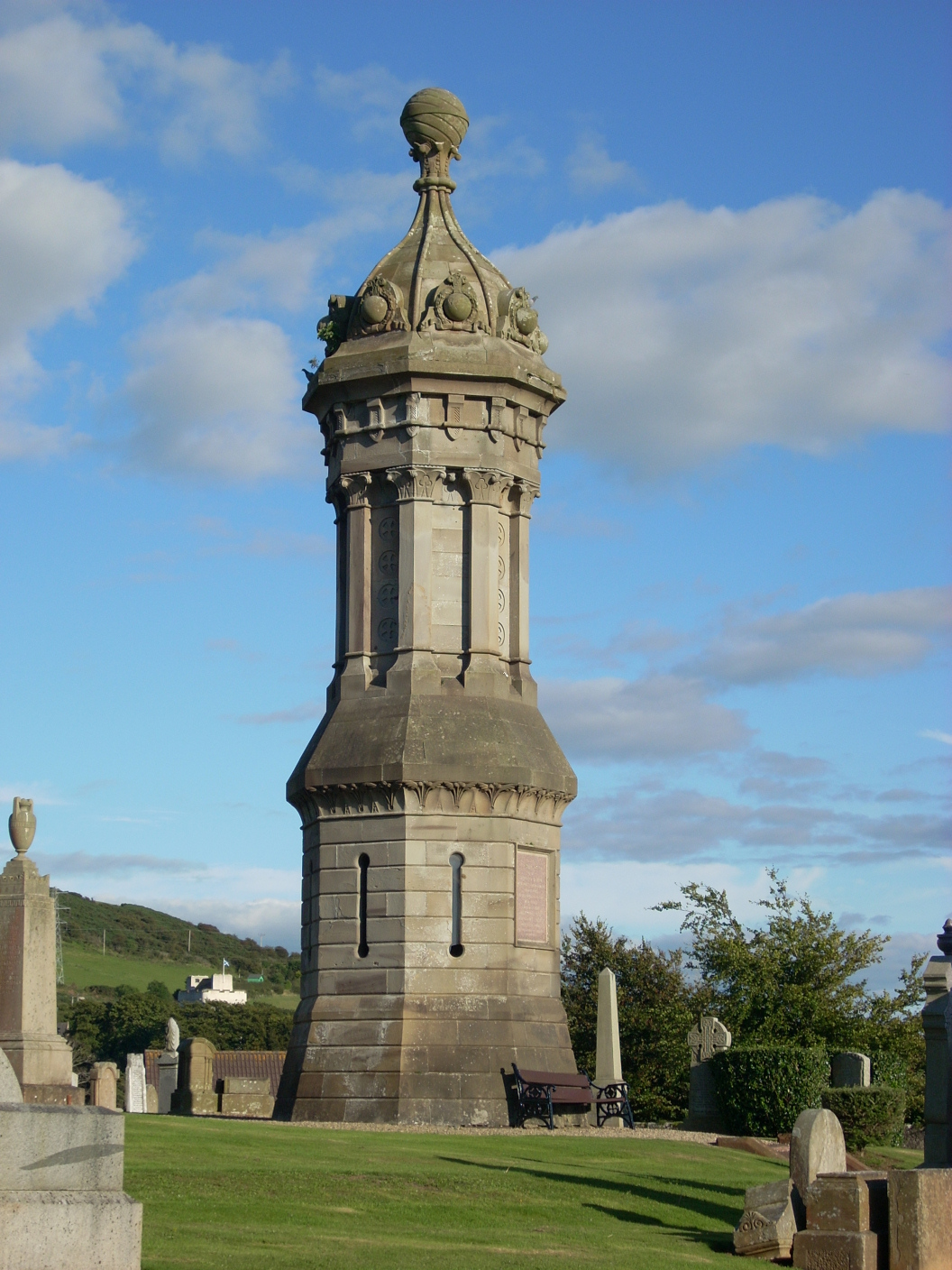
Memorial to Robert Simson. The memorial plate reads "To Dr. Robert Simson of the University of Glasgow, the Restorer of Grecian Geometry; and by his works, the great promoter of its study in the Schools. A Native of this Parish."

Notable residents of West Kilbride have included:

- Violinist Nicola Benedetti, who was born in West Kilbride, won the title of BBC Young Musician of the Year in 2004, and has played at numerous concerts around the world.
- Nobel Peace Prize laureate John Boyd Orr, who spent most of his childhood in the village
- Andy Donaldson, open water swimmer
- Loretta Doyle - Commonwealth Games gold medallist Judo - founder of The Loretta Doyle Foundation
- Sir Aylmer Hunter-Weston, World War I military leader, and MP
- Former Scotland international rugby player Brian Gossman
- Concert pianist and music scholar Roy Howat
- Inspector and superintendent of telegraphs James Kennedy Logan
- Scottish-American builder Tom Lovell
- Mathematician Robert Simson
- Scottish artist Alasdair Grant Taylor
- Connor Haggerty; Scottish diplomat currently residing in China

== In the news and popular culture ==
- West Kilbride is one of the UK's leading UFO hotspots, according to a 2004 Ministry of Defence report.
- Scenes in the BBC's Para Handy television series were filmed at sea off Portencross.
- An episode of STV's Taggart series was partly filmed in West Kilbride's Main Street.
- An episode of BBC Scotland's The Beechgrove Garden was broadcast from West Kilbride, featuring the work of local amateur gardeners and the recent enhancements to Kirktonhall Glen.
- On 4 June 2007, West Kilbride featured in BBC 2's Springwatch programme. Local vet Charlie Garrett showed how Corsehill Quarry is being turned into a wildlife conservation area.
- The opening sequence of the first episode of Billy Connolly's World Tour of Scotland, first broadcast on BBC television in 1994, features Connolly on a Caledonian MacBrayne ferry to Brodick and includes shots from the sea of West Kilbride, Seamill, and the surrounding area. Connolly comments, "This is the Scotland that everybody sings about, you know, this is the Kyles of Bute, and the Isle of Arran, the Little Cumbrae and Great Cumbrae and all these places, and if the truth be known, this is the reason I'm doing this tour, this is the bit I really like, you know, going to the Isle of Arran."

== See also ==
- Hunterston
- List of places in North Ayrshire
- Montfode Castle
- Murder of Mary Speir Gunn
