= Duncan Greenlees =

British writer and theosophist

Thomas Richard Duncan Greenlees (1899–1966) was a British writer, theosophist and teacher.

== Early life ==
Duncan Greenlees was born in Grahamstown, Cape Colony, the son of Scottish physician Thomas Duncan Greenlees (of Kilmarnock, Ayrshire) and Edith White Greenlees of Norwich. He had his early education in England. Greenlees received his MA degree in 1922 from Oxford, where he studied Egyptian, Coptic and Arabic. For a brief period during 1925 he was a staff member of Harvard University/Boston Museum of Fine Arts Expedition to Giza in Egypt. On 2 April 1925, Greenlees was appointed Assistant Curator of Egyptian Art at the Boston Museum of Fine Arts. On completion of his studies, he moved to India, working as a schoolteacher (he taught English at Madanpalle High School) and was a headmaster in South India from 1926 onwards. While working in India, he was drawn towards the Theosophical Movement and served in one of the schools which Annie Besant founded.

== Indian independence movement ==
Being a close associate of Annie Besant, Greenlees like her, was drawn to the Indian independence movement. Later, he became a fervent Gandhian and participated in his non-violent struggle against British rule. When India got independence in 1947, Greenlees was appointed to draft the new nation's education policy. Gandhi and Greenlees exchanged letters on various topics.

== Later life ==
Greenlees retired from active politics after India's independence and spent his time researching religion and theosophy. He wrote 14 small "World Gospel" books about various religions and faiths. He died in 1966 at the age of 67.

== Works ==
Greenlees wrote the 'World Gospel Series' from 1949 to 1966 following his retirement from active politics. He was primarily a social worker, rather than a politician. His talks with Ramana Maharshi and correspondence with Gandhi were purely spiritual and of devotional nature.

- The Gospel of Islam No.1
- The Gospel of China No.2 (1949)
- The Gospel of Hermes No.3 (1949)
- The Gospel of the Jesus No.4
- The Gospel of Zarathushtra No.5
- The Gospel of the Mystic Christ No.6
- The Gospel of Narada No.7
- The Gospel of Peace:Guru Granth Sahib No.8 (1952)
- The Gospel of the Pyramids No.9
- The Gospel of Advaita No.10 (1953)
- The Gospel of Israel No.11 (1955)
- The Gospel of the Prophet Mani No.12
- The Gospel of the Gnostics No.13
- The Gospel of Sri Krishna No.14

He also published The Song of Divine Love (Gita-Govinda) of Sri Jayadeva.
