= Portencross =

Coordinates: 55°42′N 4°54′W

Portencross: Scottish Gaelic: Port na Crois
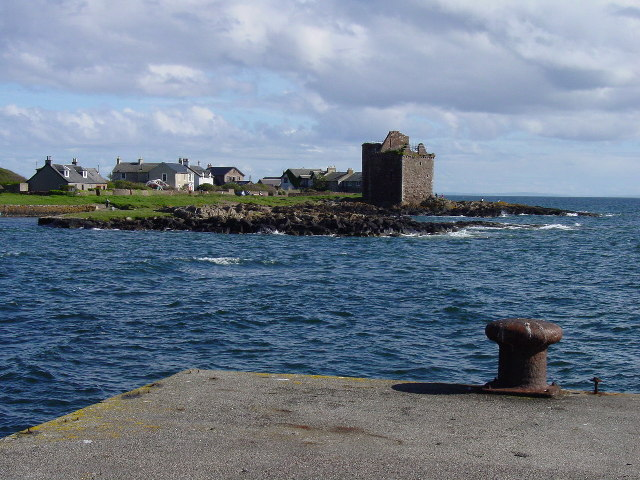
- Portencross viewed from its pier

- Location within North Ayrshire
- OS grid reference: NS176489
- Council area: North Ayrshire
- Lieutenancy area: Ayrshire and Arran
- Country: Scotland
- Sovereign state: United Kingdom
- Post town: WEST KILBRIDE
- Postcode district: KA23
- Dialling code: 01294
- Police: Scotland
- Fire: Scottish
- Ambulance: Scottish
- UK Parliament: North Ayrshire and Arran
- Scottish Parliament: Cunninghame North

Portencross (Scottish Gaelic: Port na Crois) is a hamlet near Farland Head in North Ayrshire, Scotland. Situated about three kilometres (two miles) west of Seamill and about two kilometres (1 1/4 miles) south of Hunterston B nuclear power station, it is noted for Portencross Castle.

It has two harbours and a pier. The "Old Harbour" is actually a small tidal inlet next to the castle, and is part of the castle property. The larger harbour, "North Harbour", owned by the Portencross Harbour Trust, lies about 100 m (110 yd) north of the castle and was the main access point for fishing activity.

The Portencross Pier was built in the era of Clyde steamer cruising but was never used as much as other locations such as Largs, Fairlie or Wemyss Bay.

== Natural history ==
In 2014 the North Ayrshire Ranger Service carried out a survey of the plants growing on the rocky shore, whinstone dyke, saltmarsh and "machair-like" seaside vegetation. Species recorded included sea arrowgrass (Triglochin maritima); sea sandwort (Honkenya peploides); scurvy-grass (Cochlearia officinalis); common orache (Atriplex patula); sea club-rush (Scirpus maritimus); sea milkwort (Glaux maritima); salt mud-rush (Juncus gerardii); lesser sea spurrey (Spergularia marina); cliff sand spurrey (Spergularia rupicola); sea aster (Aster tripolium); red bartsia (Odonitites verna); silverweed (Potentilla anserina); bird's foot trefoil (Lotus geniculatus); sea pink/thrift (Armeria maritima); eyebright (Euphrasia nemorosa); yellow rattle (Rhinanthus minor); sea plantain (Plantago maritima); meadow cranesbill (Geranium pratense); purple loosetrife (Lythrum salicalia); pineapple weed (Matricaria matricariodes); curled dock (Rumex crispus); scentless mayweed (Matricaria maritima); corn sowthistle (Sonchus arvensis); marsh thistle (Cirsium palustre); lady's bedstraw (Galium verum); mugwort (Artemisia vulgaris); celery-leaved crowfoot (Ranunculus scleratus); ragged robin (Lychnis flos-cuculi); yellow flag iris (Iris pseudacorus); parsley water-dropwort (Oenanthe lachenalii); greater woodrush (Luzula sylvatica); amphibious bistort (Polygonum amphibian); crow garlic (Allium vineale var. compactum); Japanese rose (Rosa rugosa); alder (Alnus glutinosa); sea buckthorn (Hippophae rhamnoides); wood sage (Teucreum scorodonia); hemlock water-dropwort (Oenanthe crocata); sticky groundsel (Senecio viscosus); bloody cranesbill (Geranium sanguineum); bracken/brake (Pteridium aquilinium); yellow splash lichen (Xanthoria parietina); crab's eye lichen (Ochrolechia parella); sea ivory (Ramalina siliquosa).

== See also ==
- Seamill
- West Kilbride
- Murder of Mary Speir Gunn
