= Goldenberry Hill =

Coordinates: 55.71220016°N 4.89408529°W

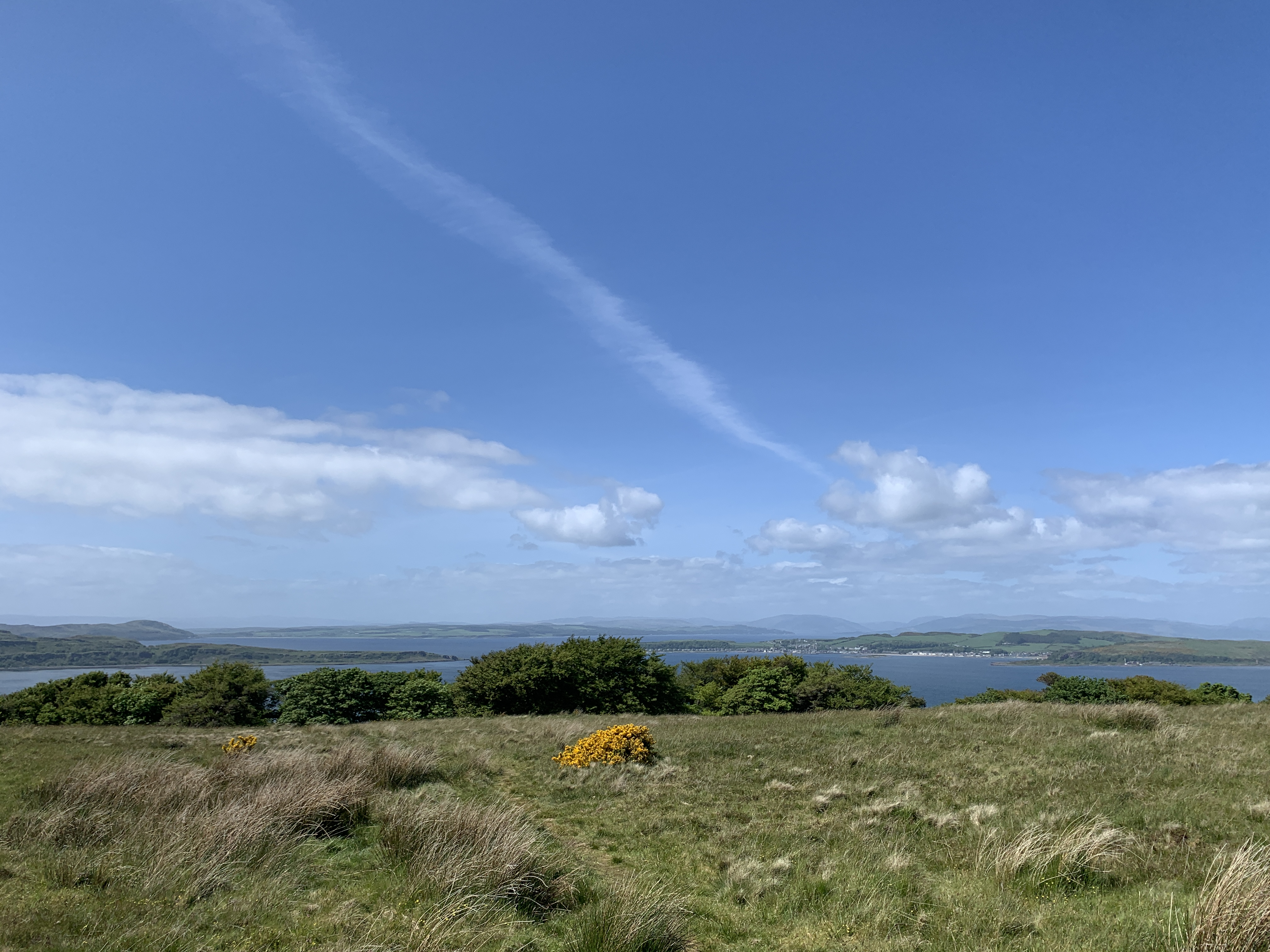
The view from the top of the hill.

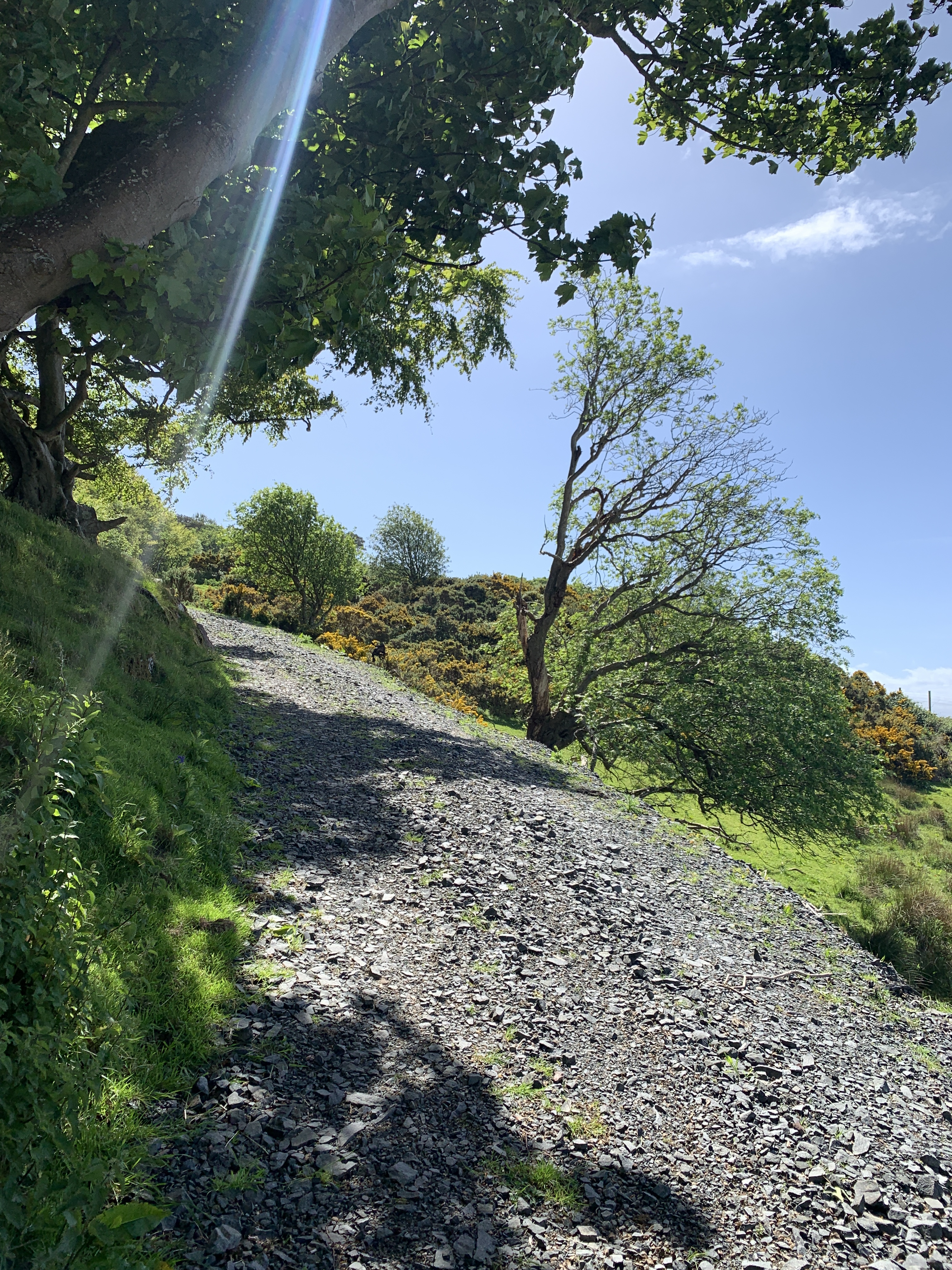
The footpath from the north up to Goldenberry Hill.

Goldenberry Hill is a hill in North Ayrshire, Scotland, near West Kilbride. It is a popular spot for walks and is visited regularly.

It is 140 metres (460 ft) high and has a prominence of 120 metres (390 ft), thus being categorised as a TuMP and HuMP.

The hill can be accessed from the north up a footpath that runs along the back of Hunterston Nuclear Plant or from the south up EE Communications Road.

The view from the top provides 360 degrees panoramic scenery across to Arran, Little and Great Cumbrae and across the firth of Clyde as well as a vantage point for seeing West Kilbride and Fairlie, North Ayrshire.

There is a Trig point within 4m of the summit as well as a slightly lower cairn and an EE phone mast.

The hill is listed by Canmore, but archaeological reports are inconclusive.
