= Archbishop's Palace, Charing =

Former bishop's palace in Kent

Coordinates: 51°12′37″N 0°47′48″E

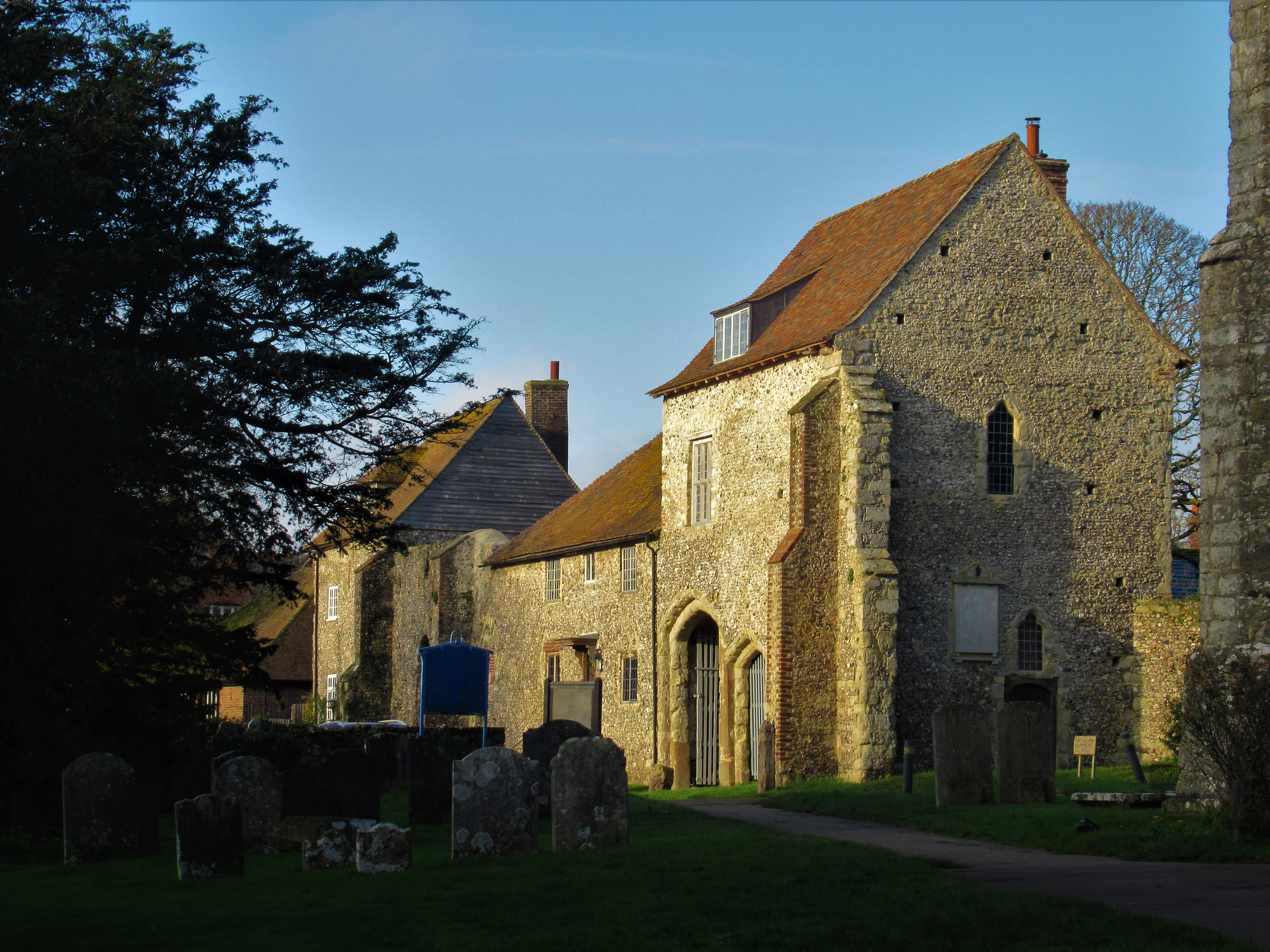
Archbishop's Palace in Charing, Kent

Archbishop's Palace, Charing, is a scheduled monument in Charing, Kent, England. The palace is an important heritage site dating back to the eighth century, and one of the earliest to be owned by the see of Canterbury. The current palace dates back to the late thirteenth century with later additions and rebuilding, notably under Archbishop John Morton in the late fifteenth century who 'made great building at Charing'.

== History ==
=== Early history ===
There was almost certainly an earlier hall on the site as the palace was said to be a favourite place for visits by Archbishop Dunstan (959-88) and Archbishop Thomas Becket (1162–70).

=== Tudor royal visits ===
Charing was one of 17 medieval palaces in the possession of the archbishopric of Canterbury and the first in a string serving the archbishops' travels between Canterbury and Lambeth Palace, the London residence of the archbishop of Canterbury. Charing was visited by a number of royal guests, prominent among them being Henry VII and Henry VIII, both of whom paid several visits.

Notably Henry VIII and his first wife Catherine of Aragon stayed at the palace, together with their vast entourage numbering over 5,000, on their way to the Field of the Cloth of Gold in France in 1520.

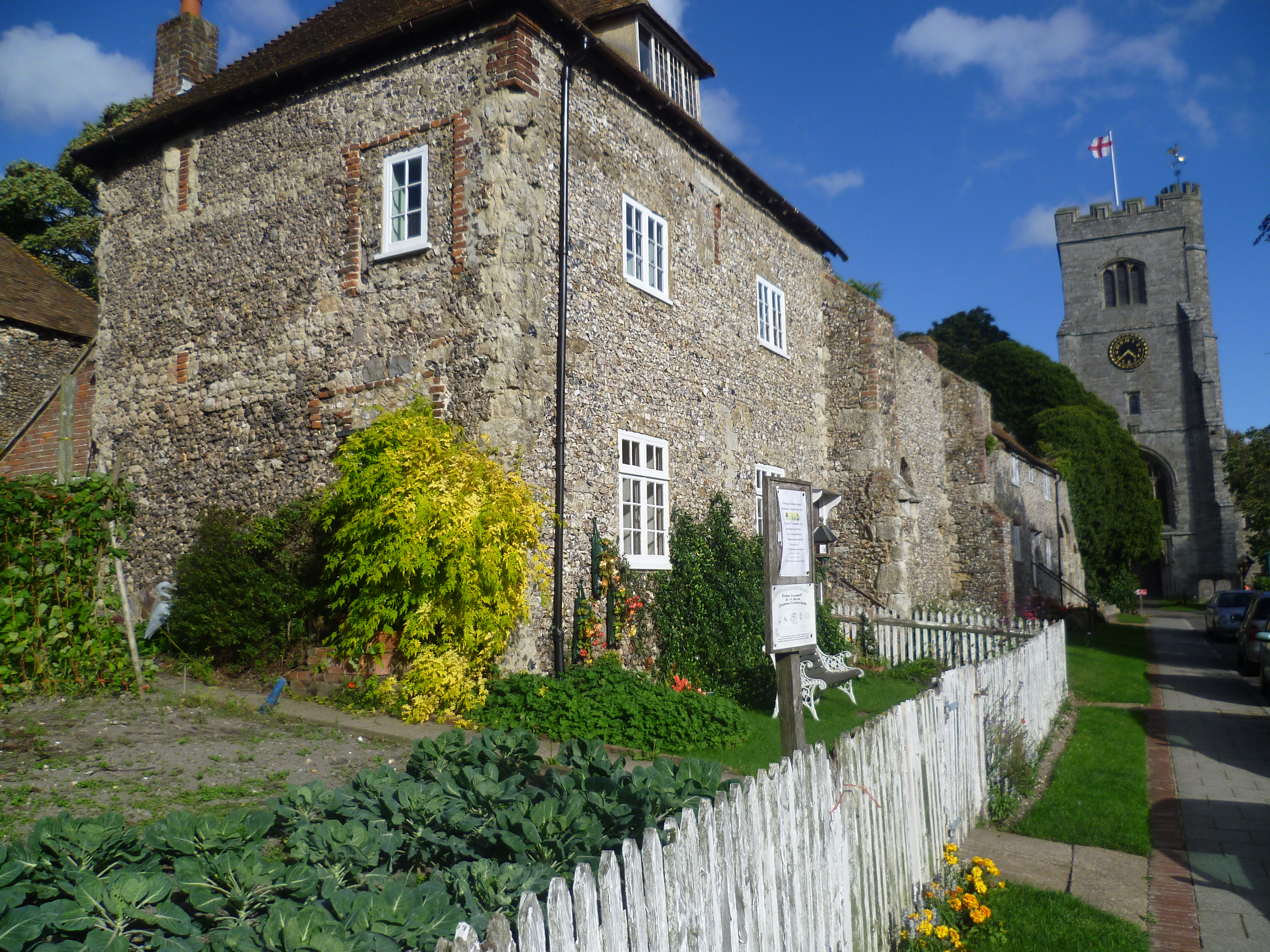
Archbishop's Palace and the Church of St Peter and St Paul

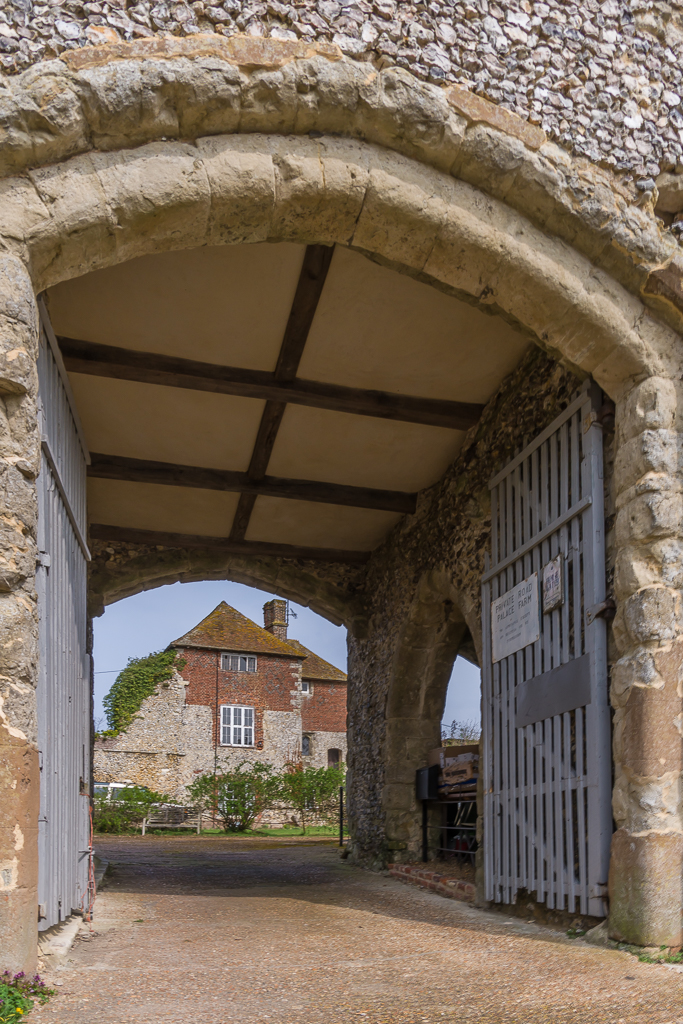
Palace Farmhouse

=== Post-reformation ===
The property was acquired by the Crown after the Dissolution of the Monasteries in 1545 and was subsequently leased to and owned by local farming gentry, notably the Honywoods and the Whelers. The present owner's family acquired the complex in the 1950s. The palace was converted into a farm complex from remains including a barn (east range of palace courtyard) and outhouse (west range).

== Preservation ==
In 1952, the palace was designated a scheduled monument and four of its buildings listed Grade I.

The Archbishop's Palace features on Historic England's Heritage at Risk Register, graded Priority Category A ("Immediate risk of further rapid deterioration or loss of fabric; no solution agreed").

In 2004, the Archbishop's Palace was a finalist in the BBC/Endemol TV series Restoration, presented by Griff Rhys Jones, Ptolemy Dean and Marianne Suhr, produced and directed by Paul Coueslant.

Efforts to preserve the Archbishop's Palace were revived with the creation of the Charing Palace Trust in 2017, which sought to raise the funds to acquire the endangered Great Hall, Archbishop's chambers, other associated buildings and the gardens. Its aim was to restore them and to make the site accessible as a community centre with new educational, public and leisure facilities. In 2021 the trustees decided to wind up the project.
