= Chartered Surveyor =

Real estate professional

Chartered Surveyor is the description (protected by law in many countries) of Professional Members and Fellows of the Royal Institution of Chartered Surveyors (RICS) entitled to use the designation (and a number of variations such as "Chartered Building Surveyor" or "Chartered Quantity Surveyor" or "Chartered Civil Engineering Surveyor" depending on their field of expertise) in the (British) Commonwealth of Nations and Ireland. Chartered originates from the Royal Charter granted to the world's first professional body of surveyors. Chartered Surveyors are entitled to use "MRICS" or "FRICS" after their names as appropriate.

Chartered Surveyors are highly trained and experienced property professionals. Surveyors offer impartial, specialist advice on a variety of property related issues and the services which they provide are diverse.

Chartered Surveyors work in all fields of property and building consultancy. At the most basic level, their duties include valuing property and undertaking structural surveys of buildings. They also provide expert consultancy advice in property, construction, and related environmental issues.

== United Kingdom ==
A Chartered surveyor in the United Kingdom is a surveyor who is a member of the Royal Institution of Chartered Surveyors ("RICS"). Until the end of the 20th century, some members were members of the ISVA ("Incorporated Society of Valuers and Auctioneers"), but this organization merged with the RICS in 1999.

In the reforms of the RICS in the 1990s, the former divisional structure of the institution was abolished, and the use of the alternative designations was retained solely for the use of members to retain clarification when informing clients of specialist areas of expertise. Despite the attempt to unify the profession under one title "chartered surveyor", there is very little in common across the whole range of disciplines that are within the grasp of all members. The core membership is based in the construction profession and another large sector deals with property ownership and management. Beyond these cores, there are marine, land, rural, and antiques specialists.

Chartered surveyors in the core of the profession may offer mortgage valuations, homebuyer's surveys and valuations, full building surveys, building surveyors' services, quantity surveying, land surveying, auctioneering, estate management, and other forms of survey and building-related advice. It is not usual for an individual member to have expertise in several areas, and hence partnerships or companies are established to create general practices able to offer a wider spectrum of surveying services.

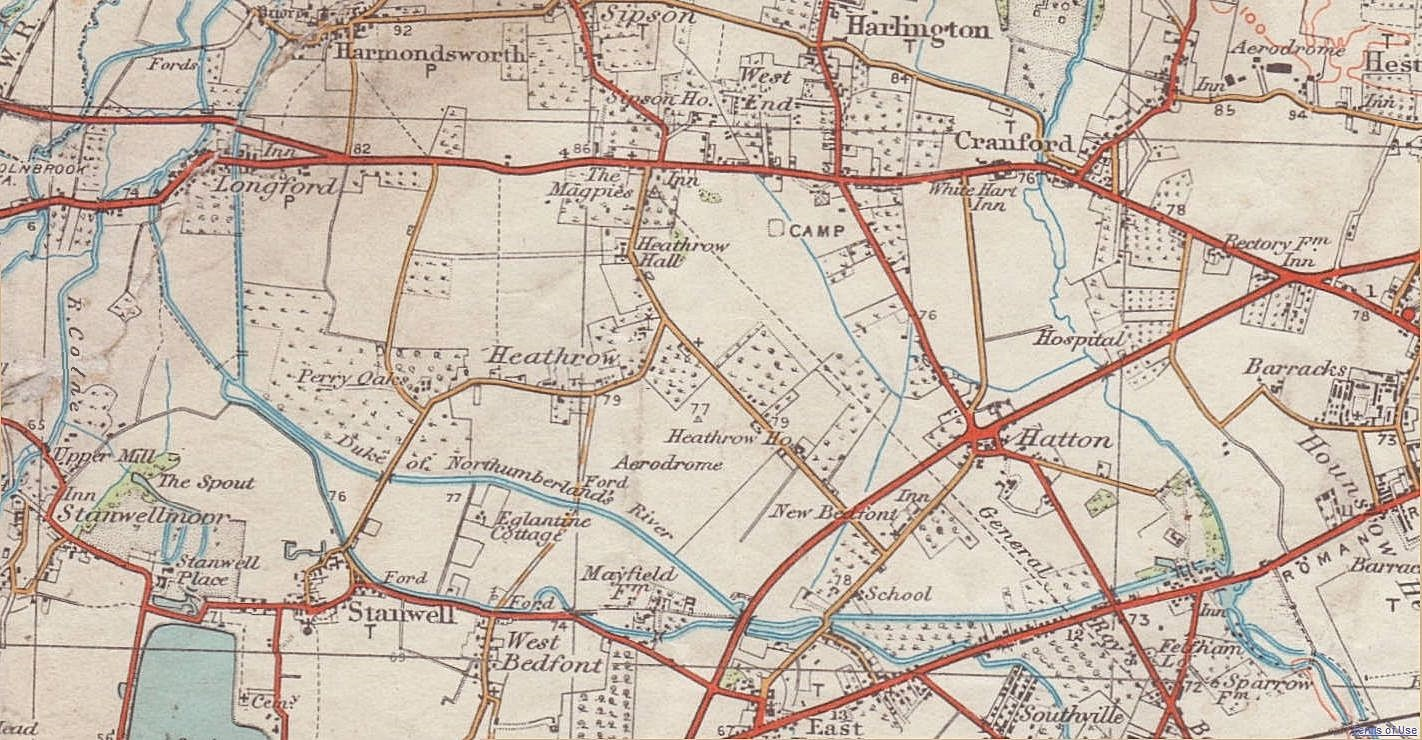
An old Ordnance survey map

=== Building surveying ===
As well as surveying, building surveyors in the UK give advice on design, construction, maintenance and repair. They may also assess damage or dilapidations on behalf of an insurance company.

A Chartered Surveyor is one who attains MRICS professional membership via the Royal Institution of Chartered Surveyors (RICS) by undergoing rigorous training and attaining key work experience across various technical competencies set out by the RICS who then in turn test, scrutinize, examine and assesses such candidates before awarding them Chartered status (MRICS). It is therefore accurate to say that all chartered surveyors can be qualified building surveyors, but not all qualified building surveyors are necessarily Chartered Surveyors.

=== Quantity surveying ===
Quantity surveyors work for private and commercial clients, main contractors and subcontractors in the construction industry. Their function is the management of the commercial interfaces of construction: writing, negotiating, awarding, and administering contracts, including variations and claims arising during the performance of a contract; cost control and cost engineering, i.e. to document and estimate costs, progress, and risks. In the UK, not all quantity surveyors are necessarily chartered surveyors; some may be chartered through the Chartered Institute of Building ("CIOB"). Albeit, the title of 'Chartered Quantity Surveyor' can only be used by Members of the Royal Institution of Chartered Surveyors.

Additional duties may include performing feasibility studies, preparing tenders, procuring materials, managing subcontractors, and even advice on taxation or building management. Surveyors may also be involved in dispute resolution.

Quantity surveyors sometimes act as project managers of a construction site.

=== Land surveying ===
Essentially, land surveying is making accurate maps and plans. Land surveying encompasses cadastral surveying, cartography, engineering surveying, hydrographic surveying and oceanographic surveying. Land surveyors may be accredited by the RICS, the Chartered Institute of Building (CIOB), or the Chartered Institution of Civil Engineering Surveyors (CICES), but only RICS members can call themselves "chartered land surveyors". Members and Fellows of CICES are eligible to attain Chartered Engineer status through the Engineering Council.

=== Auctioneering ===
Firms of chartered surveyors sometimes act in property auctions.

=== Other aspects of surveying practice ===
As well as the services mentioned above, UK chartered surveyors may offer advice in boundary disputes, business rates, compulsory purchase matters and party walls. ("Party walls" in the UK are walls on your property shared with your neighbors.)

=== Employers ===
The largest employer of Chartered Surveyors is Turner & Townsend.

=== Becoming a Chartered Surveyor ===
In order to become a Chartered Surveyor, trainees must undertake a degree accredited by the RICS and pass the Assessment of Professional Competence. Occasionally RICS withdraws accreditation of degree courses.

== Notable Chartered Surveyors ==
- Andy Irvine - retired rugby union footballer who played for Scotland is a Chartered Valuation Surveyor.
- Gavin Kerr - retired rugby union footballer who played prop for Scotland is a Chartered Building Surveyor.
- Paul Morrell - a Chartered Quantity Surveyor.
- Tim Wonnacott is a Chartered Valuation Surveyor and television presenter.
- Marianne Suhr - writer, expert on historic buildings and co-presenter of the television series Restoration is a Chartered Building Surveyor.
- Ewen Cameron, Baron Cameron of Dillington - a landowner and life peer who sits as a crossbench member of the House of Lords.
- Philip Serrell - Television presenter, chartered valuation surveyor and racing driver.

== United Arab Emirates ==
A Chartered surveyor in the United Arab Emirates is a professional who provides expert advice on various aspects related to real estate, construction, and property-related matters. Their primary role is to offer specialized services to individuals, businesses, and government entities to help them make informed decisions about property assets. Here are some of the key tasks and responsibilities of chartered surveyors in the UAE:

=== Property Valuation ===
Chartered surveyors assess the value of residential, commercial, industrial, and agricultural properties. They consider factors such as location, condition, market trends, and other relevant variables to provide accurate and impartial property valuations. They may do this with or without the help of UAE-based automated valuation models (AVMs) such as YallaValue.

=== Property Management ===
They manage and oversee real estate properties on behalf of property owners, ensuring that they are well-maintained and generating maximum returns. This may include rent collection, lease negotiations, and property maintenance.

=== Building Surveys ===
Chartered surveyors conduct detailed inspections of buildings to assess their condition and identify any structural issues, defects, or potential risks. They provide comprehensive reports to clients, which are crucial for buyers, sellers, and property investors.

=== Project Management ===
They may act as project managers for construction and development projects. They oversee the planning, design, and execution of projects, ensuring they are completed on time, within budget, and meeting quality standards.

=== Feasibility Studies ===
Chartered surveyors conduct feasibility studies for proposed real estate developments. These studies assess the viability of a project, taking into account factors such as market demand, costs, and regulatory requirements.

== See also ==
- Australian Property Institute, a similar professional body which has a reciprocity agreement with RICS
- Construction Industry Council
- RICS
- Chartered Institution of Civil Engineering Surveyors
