= Hall of Clestrain =

House in Orkney Islands, Scotland

Coordinates: 58°56′51″N 3°13′19″W

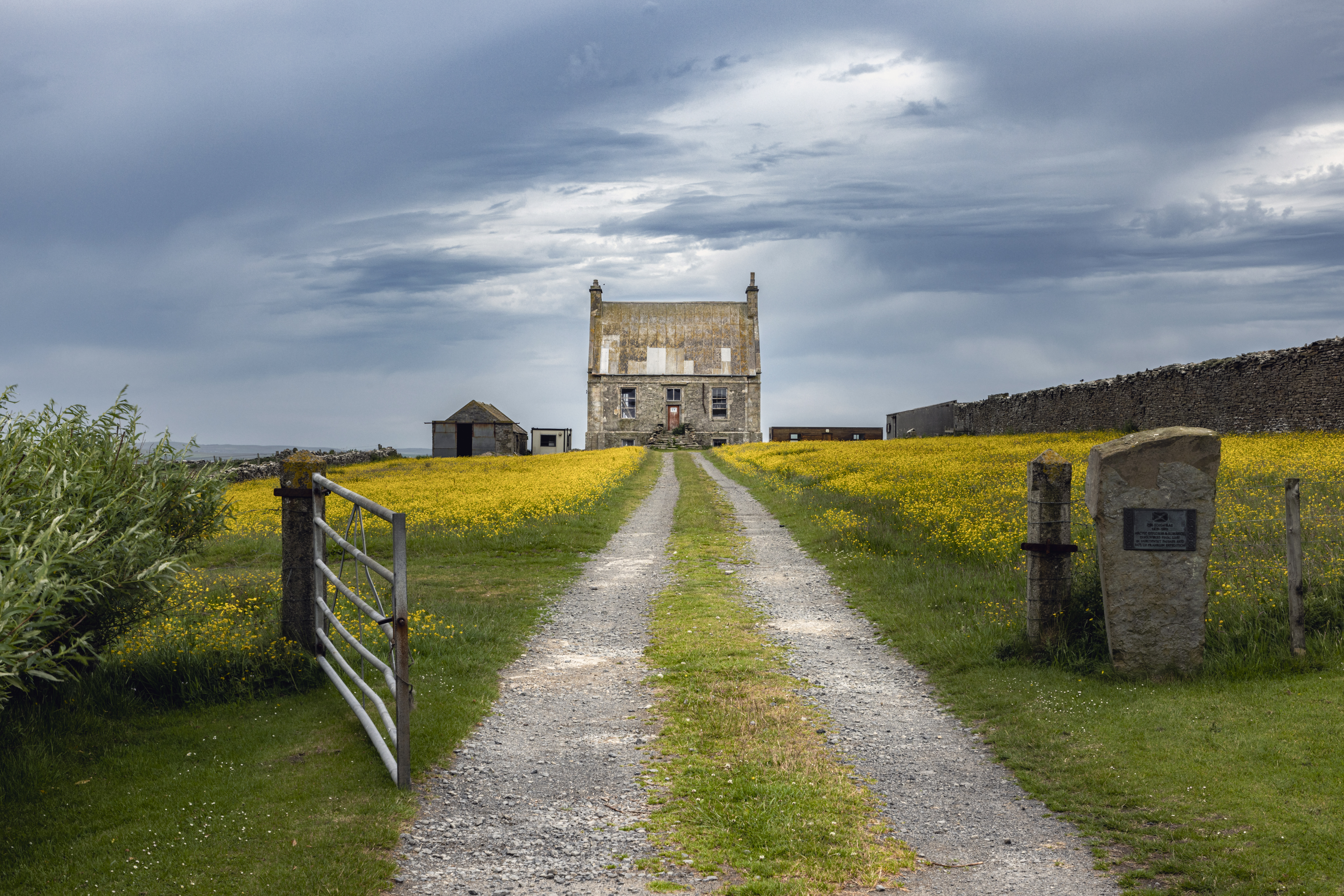
The Hall of Clestrain

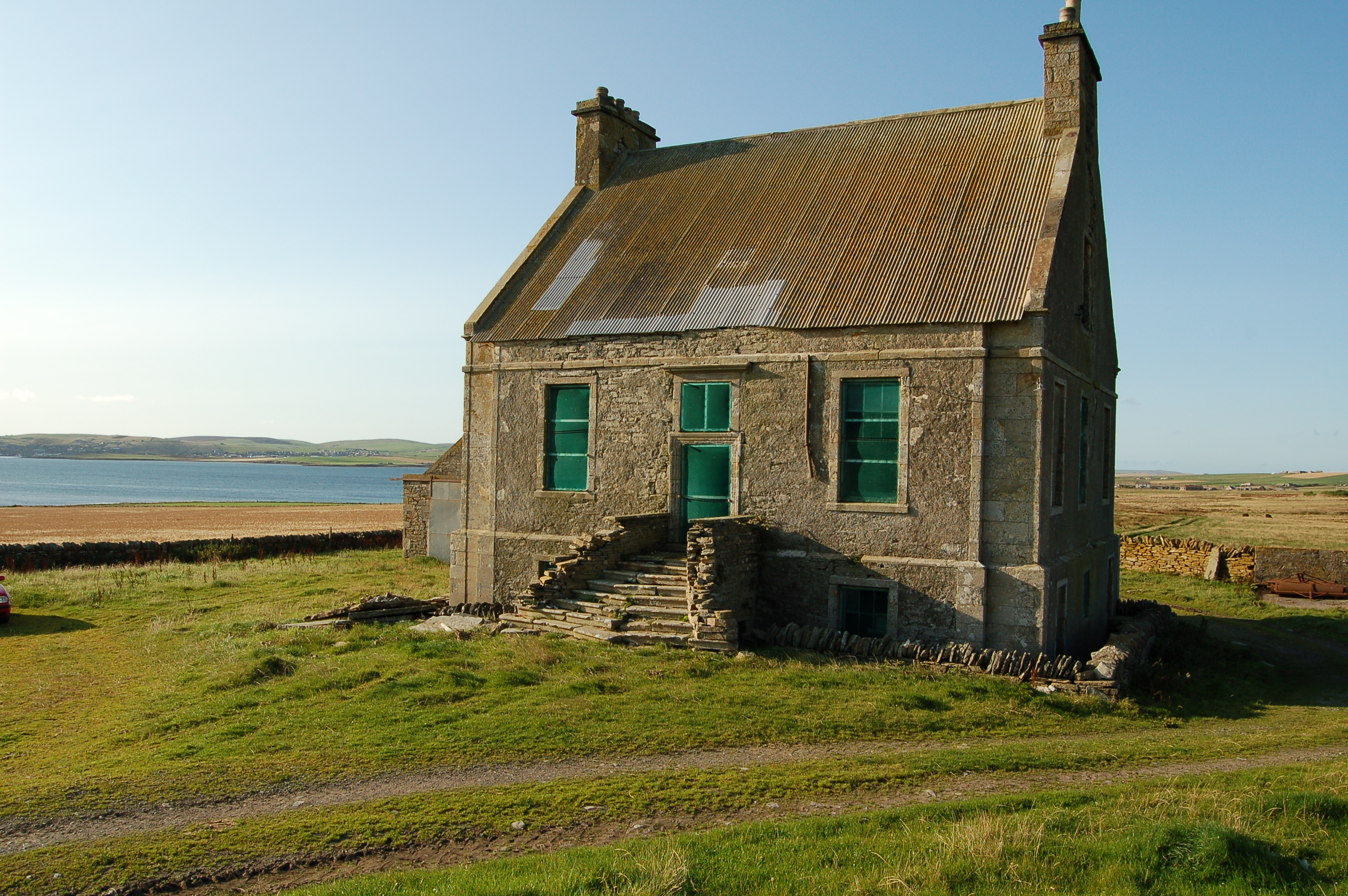
The Hall of Clestrain is currently derelict

The Hall of Clestrain is a house in the parish of Orphir, Orkney, Scotland. The house was the birthplace of the explorer John Rae in 1813. Currently derelict, the house became a listed building in 1971. It featured in the second series of the BBC TV series Restoration in 2004.

== Description ==
Although a relatively small domestic structure, the house had Palladian aspirations, and was once one of the most impressive buildings in north Scotland. Stone steps rose to a moulded entrance (once possibly pedimented) on the main front, with pavilions to either side. The square main block has three bays on each side and the gable ends. It was constructed from ashlar and harl. An internal stone staircase connects the basement, main floor and upper floor.

The house was occupied until the roof was blown off in gale in 1952. With a "temporary" replacement roof of asbestos sheets, many of the large sash windows were blocked up, and it was used as a farm building, with pigsties in the basement.

== History ==
Clestrain was part of the Graemsay estate. The estate had come into the Honeyman family as the dowry of Cecilia Graham, daughter of Harie Graham of Breckness, when she married Robert Honeyman, grandson of Andrew Honeyman who was Bishop of Orkney from 1664 to 1676. The former hall nearby (now the storehouse nearer the shoreline) was raided by the pirate John Gow on 10 February 1725.

The new hall was built in 1769 for Patrick Honeyman. He inherited the Graemsay estate after his father and brother drowned together in the Pentland Firth on journey to Edinburgh. The Honeyman family later moved to the mainland, and the house was occupied by their agent, John Rae. The hall was the birthplace of Rae's son, the Arctic explorer John Rae, in 1813. Sir Walter Scott visited Rae's parents at the house in August 1814, while touring the north of Scotland.

Currently derelict, the house became a listed building in 1971. It was included on the first Buildings at Risk Register for Scotland in 1990, and upgraded to a category A listed building in 1993. The house featured in the second series of the BBC TV series Restoration. It was intended that the building would form the centrepiece of a proposed Orkney Boat Museum. After a successful preliminary funding application in 2007 to the Heritage Lottery Fund, a second application in 2009 was turned down, and the museum plans were abandoned. The Friends of Orkney Boat Museum were wound up in 2014, but the John Rae Society hopes to restore the dilapidated hall as a museum.

In September 2016, the John Rae Society, a registered charity under Scottish law, announced that it had completed the purchase of the building, and planned to restore it and create a visitor and events centre to celebrate Rae and his legacy. The Society began its crowdfunding campaign to restore the house in December 2024.

Preceded by Portencross Castle – near West Kilbride, Ayrshire	Restorations on BBC2; 2004	Succeeded by Knockando Wool Mill – Knockando, Moray
