= Whitefield's Tabernacle, Kingswood =

Church in South Gloucestershire, England

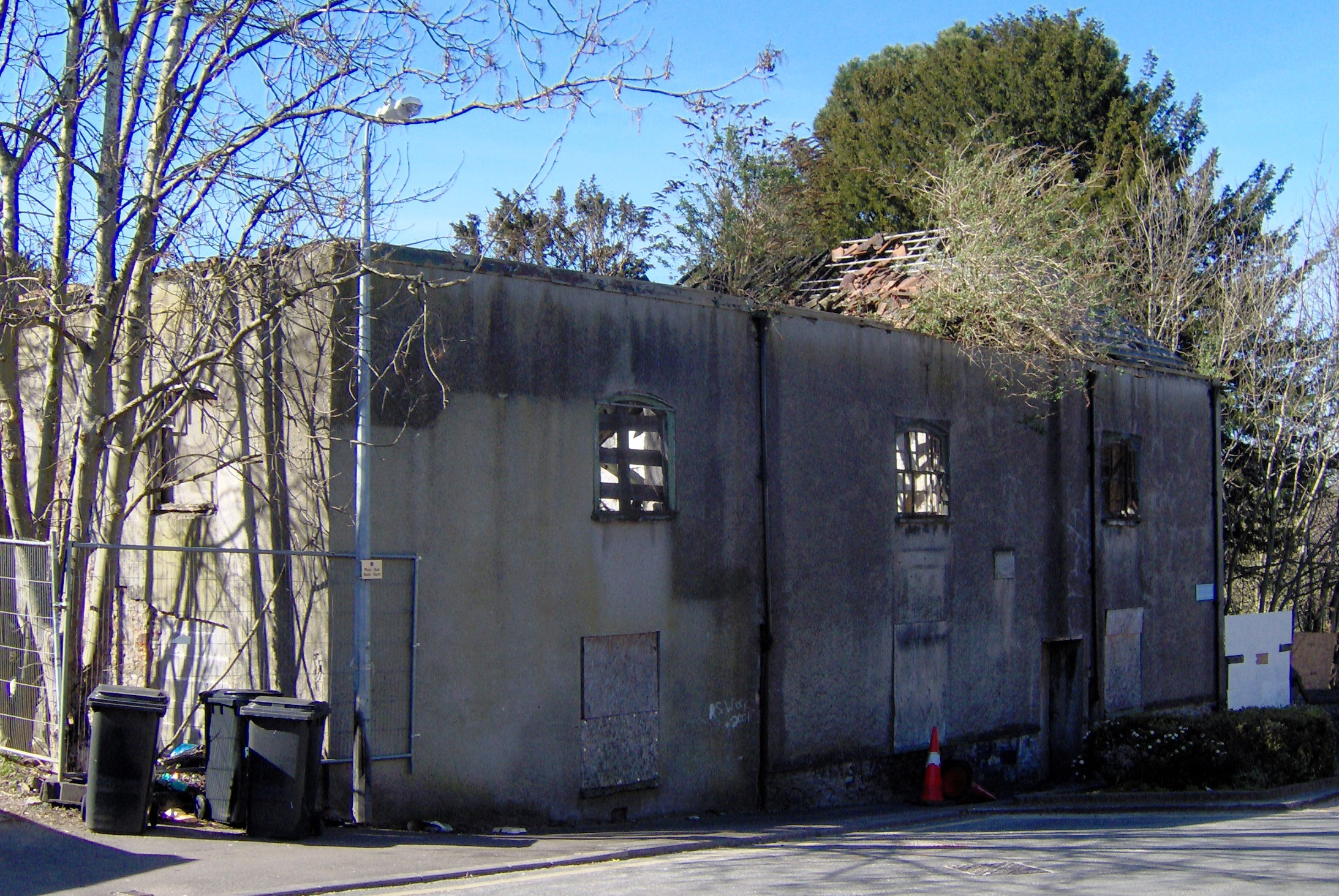
- Whitefield's Tabernacle (2007, before restoration)

- Location within Gloucestershire

Religion
- Affiliation: United Reformed Church
- District: Kingswood

Location
- Location: South Gloucestershire, England
- Interactive map of Whitefield's Tabernacle, Kingswood
- Coordinates: 51.4631°N 2.5069°W

Architecture
- Completed: 1741

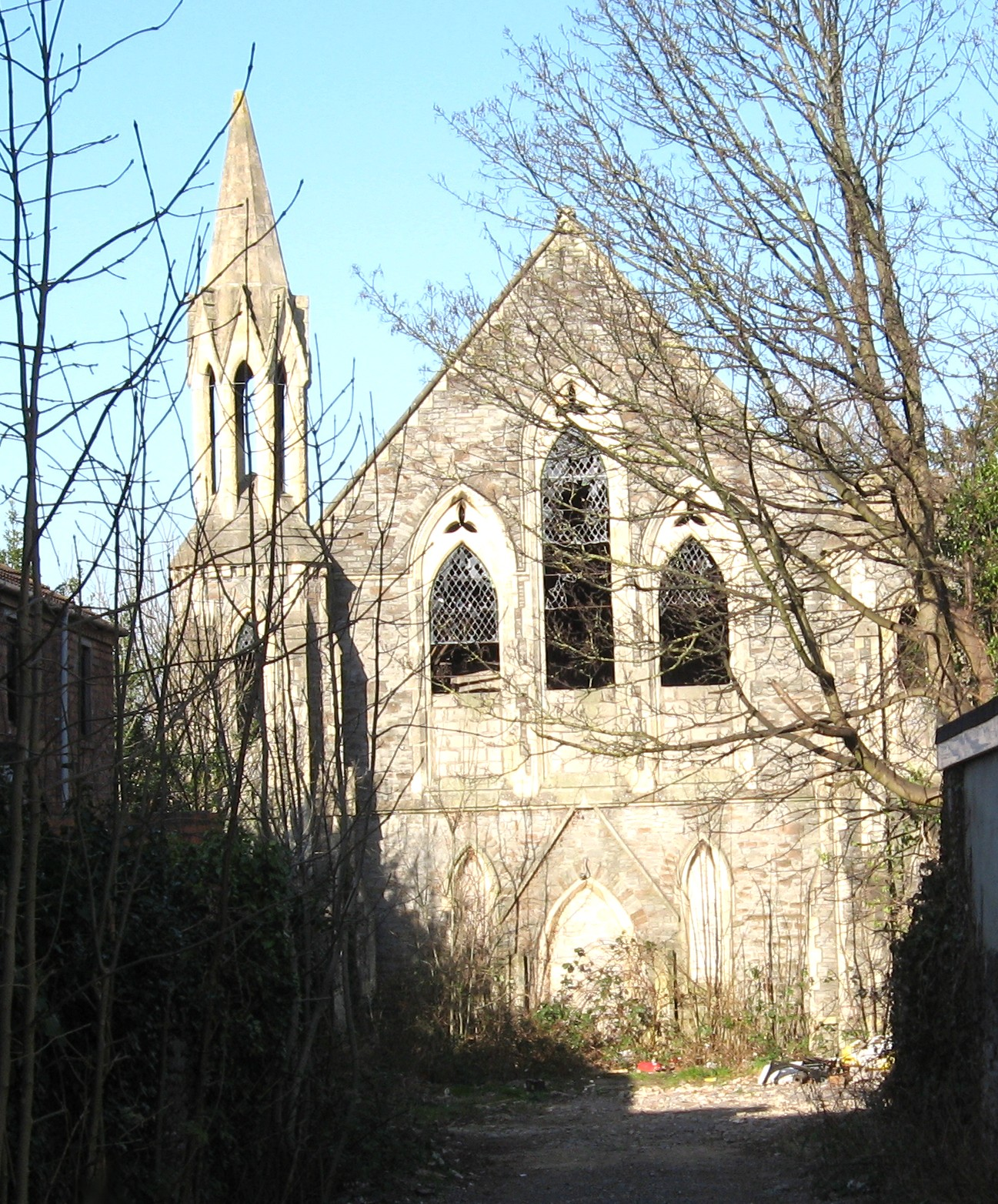
Masters Church

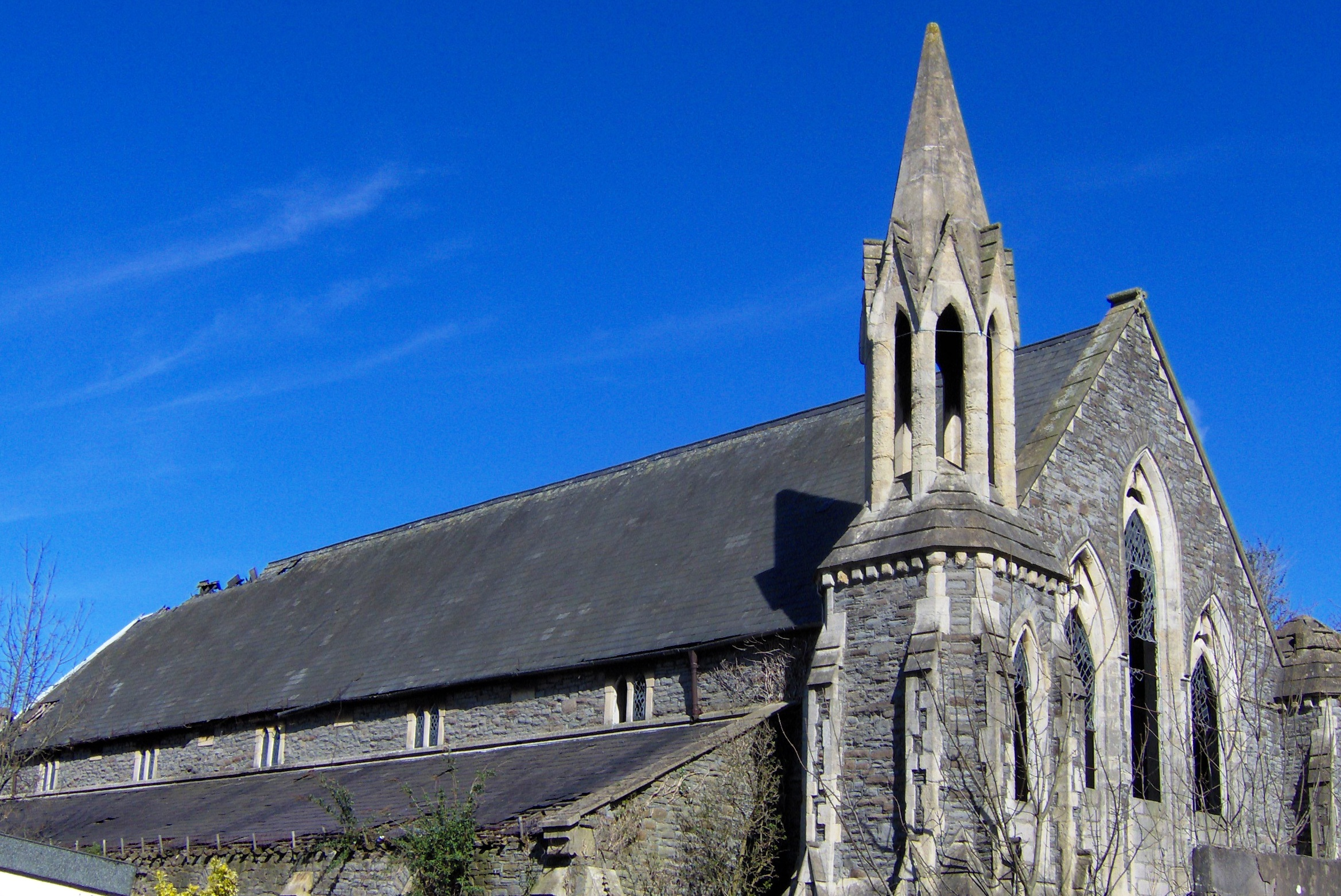
West side showing roof and window damage to the Masters Church which is just west of the Whitefield Tabernacle building

Whitefield's sometimes Whitfield's Tabernacle is a former Calvinistic Methodist and Congregational (now United Reformed) church in Kingswood, a town on the eastern edge of Bristol where George Whitefield preached in the open air to coal miners. The name refers to two buildings in which the congregation met.

The congregation originally met in the New Society Room which was built in 1741 for George Whitefield and John Cennick after a separation occurred between them and John Wesley. The former Society Room building was expanded to a large size in 1802, and is a Grade I listed building. It is now roofless and derelict after an arson attack.

In 1851 a very large Gothic building, designed by Henry Masters, was constructed just west of the original tabernacle. Masters Church is Grade II listed. In 1983 this building was closed and the United Reformed Church congregation moved back into the original 18th-century building for a few years, before leaving both buildings to join together for worship with another congregation associated with the 18th-century revival, the Moravian Church, in the Moravian building on the other side of the High Street. The new unified congregation was named United Church Kingswood and continued to worship until it closed in January 2023.

In 2003 the Tabernacle featured in the first series of BBC's Restoration programme.

As of 2007, there were plans for the redevelopment of the three listed buildings on the Tabernacle site, namely the two churches and the 18th-century Chapel House. Besides various proposed memorial facilities, the plan included flats in the Chapel House and the 19th-century building. The Masters Church is now home to the Ellis Court apartments.

The Tabernacle is owned by the Whitfield Tabernacle Trust, who acquired the building in January 2019.

After years of disuse and dereliction following a fire in 2000, restoration work began on the tabernacle in 2021 with a view to turning it into a community arts centre following a £682,000 grant from Metro Mayor Dan Norris. In an interview with BBC News in October 2025, trust leaders stated that they hoped Whitfield's can be restored by the end of 2026.

== See also ==
- Churches in Bristol
- Grade I listed buildings in Bristol
