= Chartered Building Surveyor =

A Chartered Building Surveyor is a specialist type of Chartered Surveyor involved in all aspects of property and construction, from supervising large mixed-use developments to planning domestic extensions and diagnosing building pathologies. Building surveying is one of the widest areas of surveying practice. It has a varied workload and can include everything from the conservation and restoration of historic buildings to contemporary new developments. It first became a separate and distinct discipline within the RICS in 1973. The first degree-level course for Building Surveying was the four-year Diploma in Building Surveying (DipBS) at the Glasgow College of Building and Printing which began in 1972. A course at Reading University followed shortly after.

A Chartered building surveyor in the United Kingdom can only progress through the RICS membership route. A chartered building surveyor has completed an Assessment of Professional Competence (APC) with the Royal Institution of Chartered Surveyors. The RICS was founded in London in 1868 and has more than 120,000 members globally, although less than 10% of RICS members have the specialist (chartered building surveyor) designation. They work closely with professional organisations around the globe. A chartered status is regarded as an enhancement to a building surveyor's professional status. Building surveyors work in most real estate markets including residential, commercial, retail, industrial, leisure, education and health. Consequently, there is a variety of opportunities for chartered building surveyors to work in the commercial, private, and public sectors. Many Chartered building surveyors work for property consultancies, public sector organisations, real estate owning clients and contractors as well as in a number of specialist niche areas such as insurance, rights to light, party wall matters etc. As well as technical skills, building surveyors need to have strong people skills and high levels of integrity. Clients, whether a large corporation or an individual member of the public, need to have confidence in the impartial advice given by chartered building surveyors. Chartered building surveyors are differentiated from the rest of their market by their enhanced technical knowledge and professional standards.

== Employers ==
The largest employer of Chartered Building Surveyors is EC Harris followed by Jones Lang LaSalle.

== Notable Chartered Building Surveyors ==
- Gavin Kerr - retired rugby union footballer who played prop for Scotland.
- Marianne Suhr - writer, expert on historic buildings and co-presenter of the television series Restoration.
