= List of Restoration candidates =

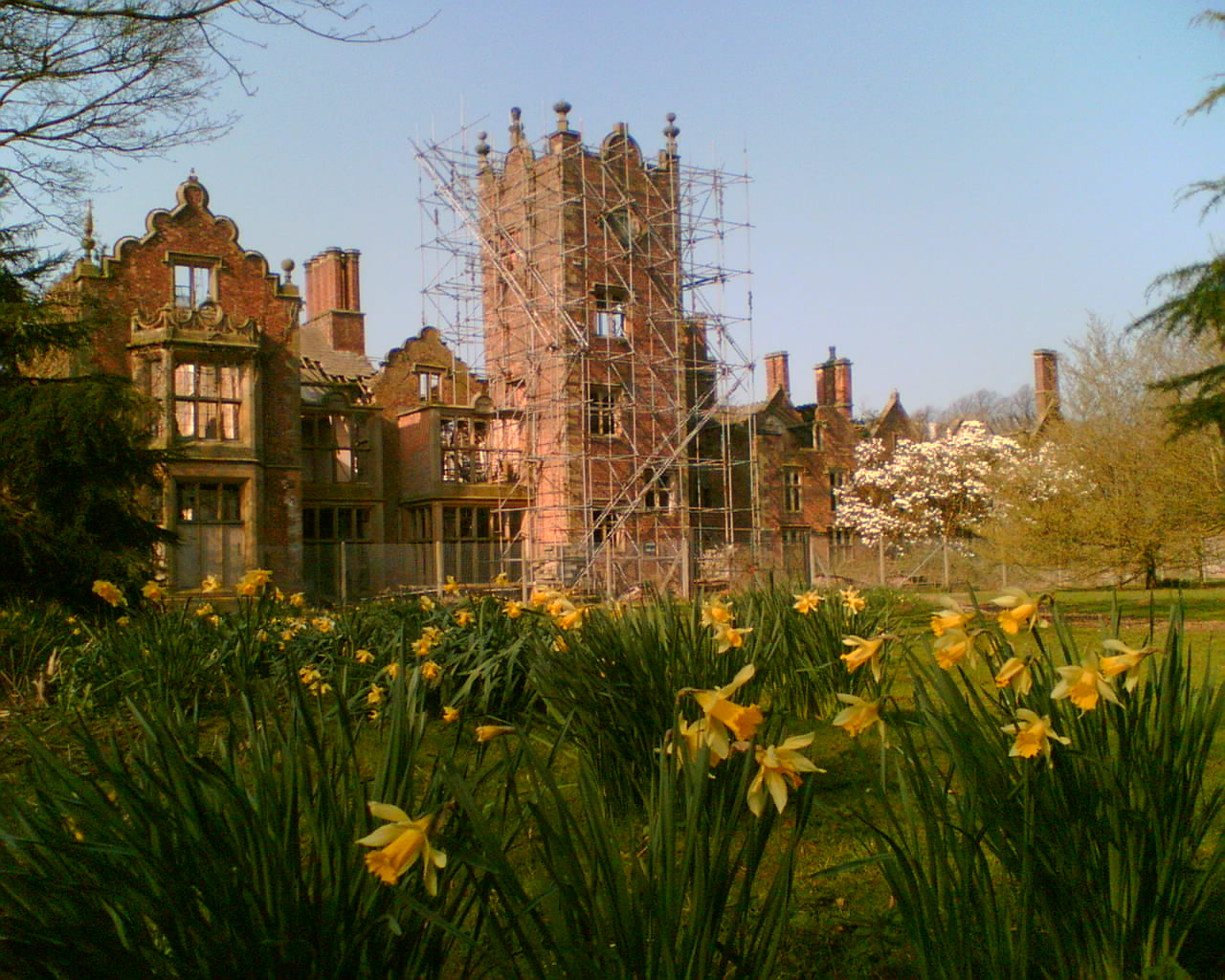
Bank Hall in Bretherton was the first candidate shown in the first Restoration series.

The following list of Restoration candidates itemises all 72 of the buildings at risk featured in the BBC TV series Restoration. The series was aired over three seasons in 2003, 2004 and 2006 with the aim of publicising and saving severely neglected buildings of heritage importance throughout the United Kingdom.

== First series (2003) ==
North West England (aired 8 August)

Bank Hall – Bretherton, near Chorley, Lancashire – Most popular regional runner-up
Brackenhill Tower – Longtown, near Carlisle
Victoria Baths – Manchester – Finalist > Winner

East of England (aired 12 August)

Coalhouse Fort – East Tilbury, Essex
Moulton Windmill – Moulton, near Spalding, Lincolnshire
Greyfriars Tower – King's Lynn, Norfolk – Finalist

Scottish Lowlands (aired 15 August)

Britannia Music Hall – Glasgow
Nairn's Linoleum Works – Kirkcaldy, Fife
Mavisbank House – Dalkeith, Midlothian – Finalist

South West England (aired 19 August)

Poltimore House – Poltimore, near Exeter – Finalist
Arnos Vale Cemetery – Bristol
Whitefield's Tabernacle – Kingswood, near Bristol

Northern Ireland (aired 22 August)

Lissan House – Cookstown, County Tyrone – Finalist > Second place
Herdmans Mill – Sion Mills, near Strabane, County Tyrone
The Crescent Arts Centre – Belfast

English Midlands (aired 26 August)

Newman Brothers Coffin Factory – Birmingham
Cromford Mill – Cromford, near Matlock, Derbyshire
Bethesda Chapel – Stoke-on-Trent – Finalist

Scottish Highlands (aired 29 August)

Kinloch Castle – Rùm – Finalist
Easthouse Croft – Duncansclate (or Duncansclett), Burra, Shetland
Glen O'Dee Sanitorium – Banchory, Aberdeenshire

North East England (aired 2 September)

Ravensworth Castle – Gateshead
Harperley Prisoner-of-War Camp – near Crook, County Durham
Conservatory and Folly Castle at Wentworth Castle – near Barnsley, South Yorkshire – Finalist > Third place

Wales (aired 5 September)

Faenol Old Hall – Vaynol (Welsh spelling: Y Faenol), near Bangor, Gwynedd
Amlwch Port and Parys Mountain – Amlwch, Anglesey
Llanelly House – Llanelli, Carmarthenshire – Finalist

South East England (aired 9 September)

Broomfield House – Palmers Green, London
Wilton's Music Hall – Tower Hamlets, London – Finalist
Darnley Mausoleum – Cobham, Kent

== Second series (2004) ==
Scotland (aired 13 July)

Portencross Castle – near West Kilbride, Ayrshire
Hall of Clestrain – Orphir, Orkney
Knockando Wool Mill – Knockando, Aberlour, Moray – Finalist

England: South East (aired 18 July)

Archbishop's Palace – Charing, Kent – Finalist
Walpole's villa, Strawberry Hill – Twickenham, London
Severndroog Castle – Greenwich, London

Wales (aired 20 July)

Cardigan Castle and Castle Green House – Cardigan, Ceredigion
Llanfyllin Union Workhouse – Llanfyllin, Powys
Celynen Collieries' Workingmen's Institute and Memorial Hall – Newbridge, Caerphilly – Finalist > Second place

England: South West (aired 25 July)

Sherborne House, Dorset – Sherborne, Dorset – Finalist
Castle House – Bridgwater, Somerset
South Caradon Mine – Caradon Hill, near Liskeard, Cornwall

England: North (aired 27 July)

Sheffield Manor Lodge – Sheffield
Gayle Mill – Gayle, near Hawes, North Yorkshire – Finalist > Third place
Lion Salt Works – Northwich, Cheshire

Northern Ireland (aired 1 August)

Armagh Gaol – Armagh
Lock-Keepers Cottage – Newforge, Belfast
Derry Playhouse – Derry – Finalist

England: Midlands and East Anglia (aired 3 August)

Newstead Abbey – Ravenshead, Nottinghamshire
Old Grammar School and Saracen's Head (now St Nicolas Place) – King's Norton, Birmingham – Finalist > Winner
Bawdsey Radar Station – Bawdsey, Suffolk – Most popular regional runner-up > Finalist

== Third series "Restoration Village" (2006) ==
1. England: South East

Woodrolfe Granary – Tollesbury, Essex
Massey's Folly – Farringdon, Hampshire
Watts Gallery – Compton, Surrey – Finalist > Second place

2. England: South West

The Barton – Welcombe, Torridge, Devon
Dawe's Twine Works – West Coker, Somerset
Trinity Methodist Chapel – Newlyn, Cornwall – Finalist

3. England: Midlands and East Anglia

All Saints Church – Beckingham, Lincolnshire
Pennoyer's School – Pulham St Mary, Norfolk
Chedham's Yard – Wellesbourne, Warwickshire – Finalist > Winner

4. Scotland

Dennis Head Old Beacon – North Ronaldsay, Orkney – Finalist > Third Place
Greenlaw Town Hall – Greenlaw, Berwickshire
Cromarty East Church – Cromarty, Highland – Most popular regional runner-up > Finalist

5. Wales

Pembrey Court (now Court Farm) – Pembrey, Carmarthenshire
Pen-yr-Orsedd Quarry – Nantlle, Gwynedd – Finalist
Prichard Jones Institute – Newborough, Anglesey

6. Northern Ireland

Gracehill Old Primary School – Gracehill, County Antrim
Cushendun Old Church – Cushendun, County Antrim – Finalist
The White House – Newtownabbey, County Antrim

7. England: North

Howsham Mill – Howsham, North Yorkshire – Finalist
Higherford Mill – Higherford, near Nelson, Lancashire
Heugh Gun Battery – Hartlepool, County Durham
