= Workingman's Institute and Memorial Hall =

- Newbridge Memorial Hall and Institute
- Location within Wales
- Alternative names: Newbridge Memo

General information
- Location: Meredith Terrace, Newbridge, Newport NP11 4FH, Newbridge, UK
- Coordinates: 51°40′51″N 03°08′52″W
- Completed: 1908
- Renovated: 1924, 2010s
- Cost: £6,000 (1908) + £10,000 (1924)

Technical details
- Floor count: Countless

Design and construction
- Architects: R. L. Roberts (1908), E. D. T. Jenkins (1924)

Website
- newbridge-memo.co.uk

The Workingman's Institute and Memorial Hall (The Institute and Memo) is an historical miners' institute, working men's club and multi-purpose community centre in Newbridge in South Wales. It includes a memorial to those from the town who died in the World War I and World War II. It also houses a library, reading rooms, an art deco cinema, a sprung dance floor and a theatre. The hall was built in 1908 and in 1924 the Memorial Hall was added. The whole project was paid for by small contributions from local miners.

== History ==
This community centre began when a group of local coal miners created a committee for the improvement of social conditions of miners in Newbridge in 1898. This committee occupied a room in the Beaufort Arms hotel in Bridge Street and later two rooms in a coffee tavern. Coal was vital to the economy and industry of Great Britain, and the Newbridge miners wanted to improve themselves in a world where the labour force was becoming more and more important. The miners committee moved to more spacious premises when the proprietor of a coffee shop in the village allocated two rooms in the institution.

A workmen's institute was necessary to create greater social cohesion and other educational and leisure activities and the committee secured the freehold site for £300. Community members W.N. Jones, V. Phillips, H. Badge and H.J. Thomas were of crucial importance in this process. The Newbridge Workingman's Institute building was constructed by commissioned architect R. L. Roberts. It was officially opened in 1908 by John Beynon, the owner of the Celynen Colliery.

In this building were an extensive library, a billiards room with four tables, a committee room and a reading room.

In October 1914 the British Army entered the First World War and Newbridge supplied coal and soldiers to the front line. Demobilisation was passed in November 1920, but not all the town's young men returned home. Newbridge decided to construct a memorial to those who had died in 'the war to end all wars'. The memorial's contractor was Ewart Evans, and it cost about £10,000. The building was erected under the oversight of by E.D.T. Jenkins (architect) and opened in 1924; local residents nicknamed it the 'Memo'. In this building were a picture house and stage on the upper floor, with a dancehall, along with dressing room facilities, on the lower floor. After the Second World War the 'Memo' also became a monument to victims of that war.

Mining eventually ceased in the mid-1980s, after persevering through the 1926 United Kingdom general strike, the 1930s Depression and post-war nationalisation, but became unsustainable following the UK miners' strike (1984-1985), with the Institute becoming a drinking club.

In 2004, when the local council was considering purchasing the land for a car park, a public meeting called by local MP Don Touhig led to the formation of The Friends of Newbridge Memo, who had the building selected as one of the potential projects on the BBC2 programme Restoration. The series aired around 19 July 2004. They narrowly missed winning the final but received assistance from the Heritage Lottery Fund to begin the long process of raising money to restore both buildings.

After a development grant was awarded by the Heritage Lottery Fund in the summer of 2009, Cadw and Caerphilly County Borough Council have actively supported the scheme. The Big Lottery awarded £500,000 in December 2009.

== Performances ==
The centre was popular as an amateur theatre in Wales between the wars. Productions included Henrik Ibsen's Ghosts, produced by E. Eynon Evans and starring Donald Houston. In the 1930s–1950s The Memo was also a popular music hall. Artistes included Clara Novello Davies, Webster Booth, Anne Ziegler, Owen Brannigan, accompanist Gerald Moore, and Joe Loss.

From the mid-1970s through the 1980s, the Memo became a concert venue for rock bands. Bands included Iron Maiden, Dave Edmunds, Dire Straits (25 June 1978; Dire Straits tour), The Stranglers, The Cars, Motörhead, Whitesnake, Vinegar Joe, Paul Young, Mickey Gee, Paul King, The Groundhogs, Shakin Stevens, Dr. Feelgood, Tom Robinson Band, and Marillion.

== In popular culture ==
The Newbridge Memo has been used as a location for various TV shows and films.

- The auditorium and vestibule were featured in BBC's Sherlock, in the first episode, "The Blind Banker". Some of the recording was carried out prior to restoration.
- Filming began in 1999 of the Sara Sugarman film Very Annie Mary. The film's plot focused on various performances at the Memo.
- Various scene of episode 6 of series 2 of Doctor Who, in an episode titled "The Doctor's Daughter", were filmed at Memo featuring David Tennant.
- The auditorium was used as the location for Doctor Who in the 2013 episode "Nightmare in Silver", featuring Matt Smith as the doctor.
- The auditorium and exterior of Memo were used for another episode in the same series, "The Rings of Akhaten".
- The restoration of the building was documented as part of an episodes of the 2004 BBC series Restoration.
- Memo featured as a principle filming Location for the 2008 David Howard film Flick.
- Memo was converted into a cinema for the filming of series 4 of the Netflix series Sex Education, featuring shots of the exterior, ticket hall and auditorium.

== Awards and nominations ==
Year	Award	Category	Nominee	Result
2015	National Lottery Good Causes Award	Best Heritage Project	Newbridge Memo	Finalist

== Publications ==
- Newbridge Memo. The Celynen Collieries and Workingman's Institute and Memorial Hall. Friends of Newbridge Memo. p. 46.
- "Newbridge Memorial Hall and Institute". Restoration. BBC. July 2006.

Preceded by Ghost Story: Plas Teg	Ghost Story on ITV Wales; 30 January 2008 (Season 2, Episode 3)	Succeeded by Ghost Story: Laugharne Boathouse
Preceded by Llanfyllin Union Workhouse, Llanfyllin	Restorations on BBC2 about 19 July 2004	Succeeded by Portencross Castle – near West Kilbride, Ayrshire
