= Portencross Castle =

Castle in Portencross, Scotland

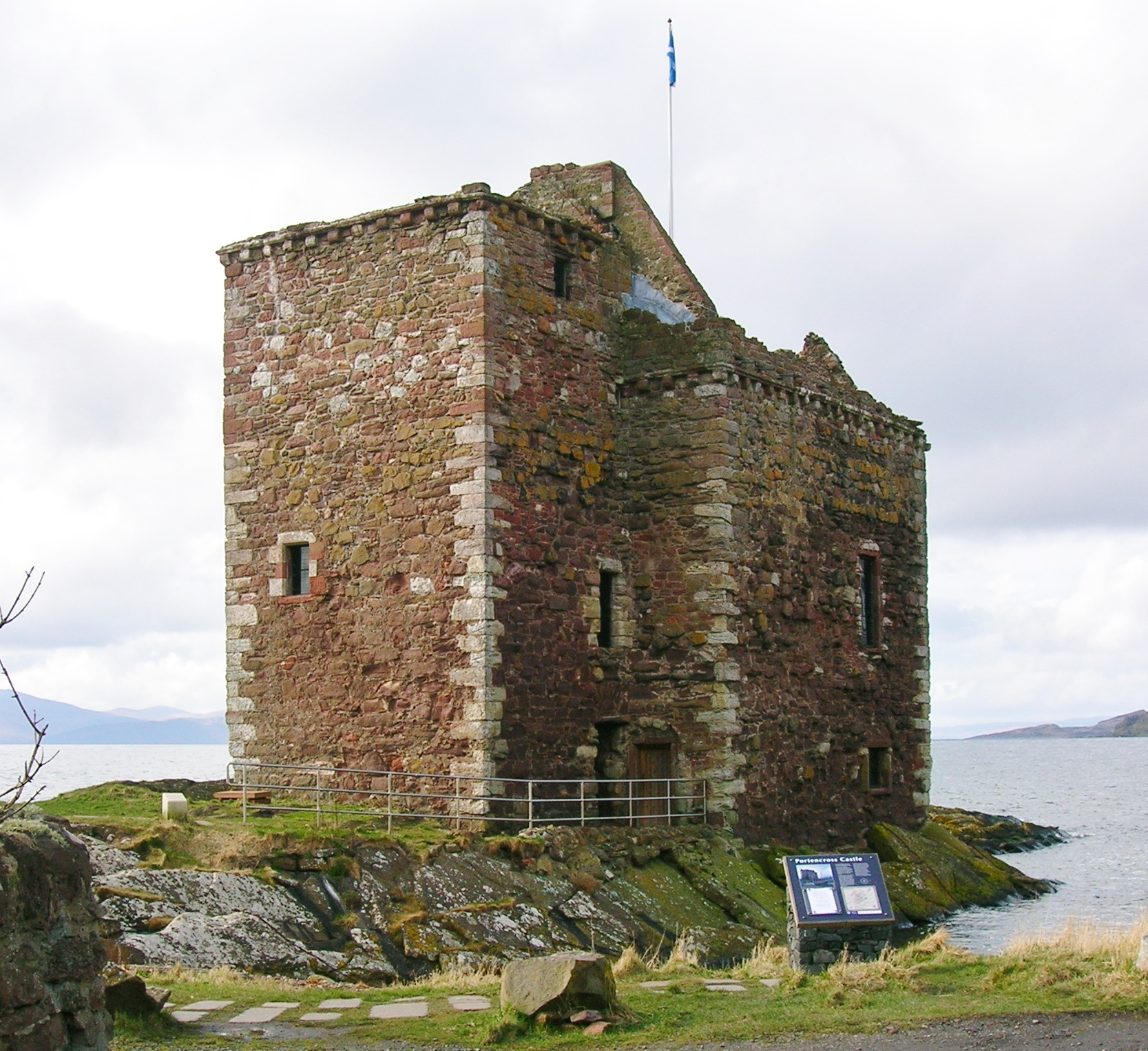
- Portencross Castle in 2013
- Type: Tower house
- Location: Portencross, North Ayrshire, Scotland
- Coordinates: 55°41′57.73″N 4°54′18.34″W
- Built: c. 14th century

Scheduled monument
- Official name: Portencross Castle
- Type: Secular: castle
- Designated: 29 March 1955
- Reference no.: SM327

Portencross Castle, also known historically as Portincross Castle, is situated in Portencross, on the west coast of Scotland, about 3 km from West Kilbride. The site has been fortified since the 11th Century. The present tower castle is thought to date from the mid-14th Century and later. It remained in use until it was unroofed by a great storm in 1739 and gradually became ruinous. The castle was designated as a scheduled monument in 1955.

The castle was one of the buildings featured in the 2004 series of the BBC television programme Restoration and was the subject of efforts by a local community group to secure its future.

== History ==
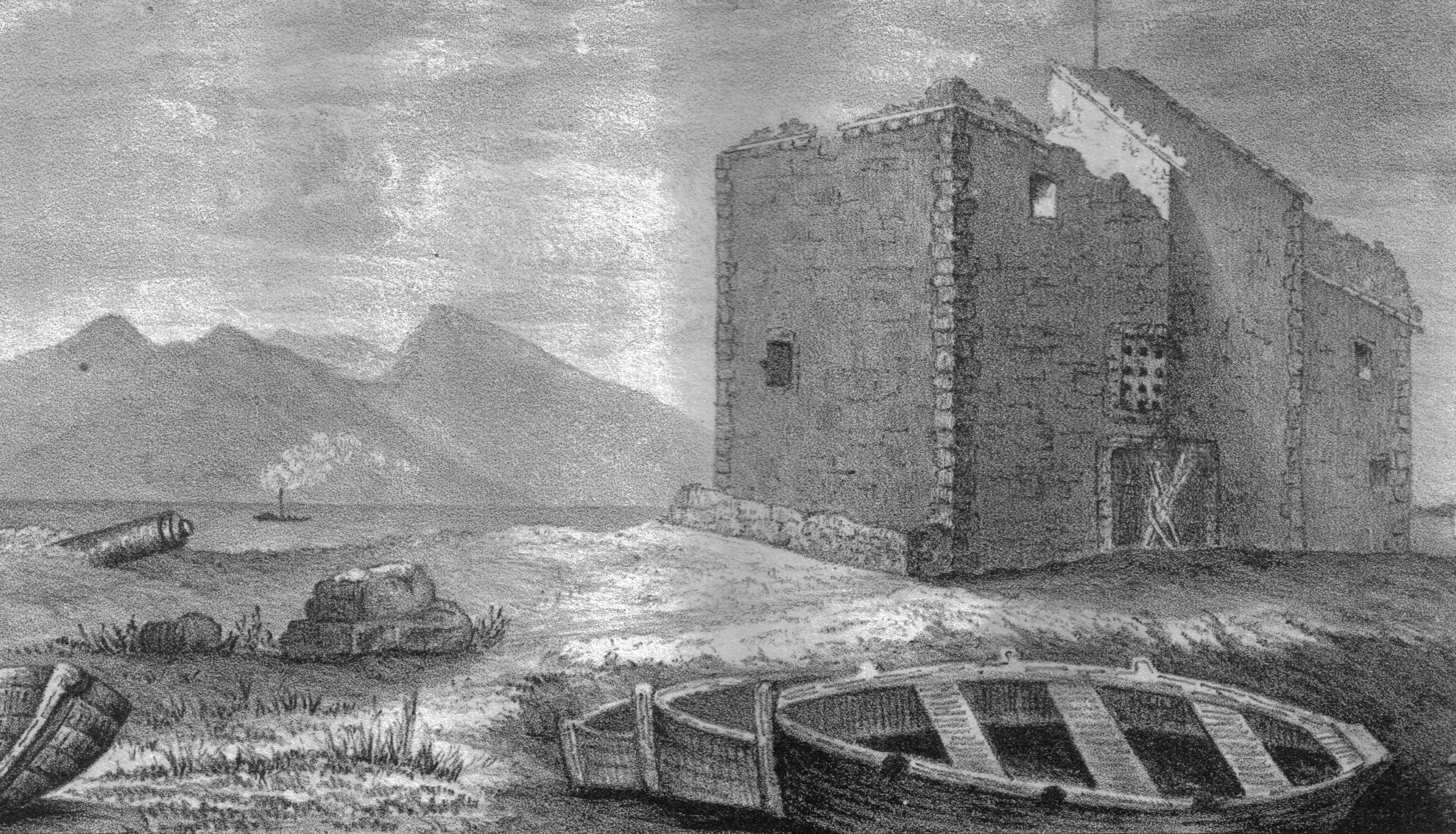
Portencross Castle in the 1840s.

In the castle's earliest days, it was known as "Arneil" (alternatively spelled "Arnele" or "Ardneil") and was held by the de Ross family. After the victory over the English at the Battle of Bannockburn in 1314, King Robert the Bruce gave the estate to Sir Robert Boyd of Kilmarnock a year later. Replacing a small castle on Auld Hill, Portencross castle was rebuilt in the mid- to late-14th century on a rock promontory at the bottom of Auld Hill, overlooking the Firth of Clyde by Boyd's grandson, also named Robert Boyd. It served as the caput of the Barony of Ardneil. From this location, King Robert II probably signed 15 charters dated at Arnele between 1371 and 1390.

== Description ==
Portencross Castle was probably first constructed as a stone-built hall house and there may have been a barmkin protecting the structure. The next phase of building was to add upper storeys and an attic in the late 1400s. Around this time a ground-floor entrance was also added. The Boyds retained ownership of the castle until 1737 and made further alterations, including adding upper attic rooms and extending the spiral staircase to reach them. The local fisherman continued to use the castle after it was unroofed in 1739 and they may have made a number of small alterations.

The castle has an oblong keep that is three storeys high with a garret. The wing, located at one end of the keep is one storey higher. The entire ground floor is vaulted and there are entrances on the ground floor and in the first storey. It has been restored by the Friends of Portencross Castle during the 2010s and is maintained by them as a museum.

== See also ==
- List of Restoration candidates

== Notes ==
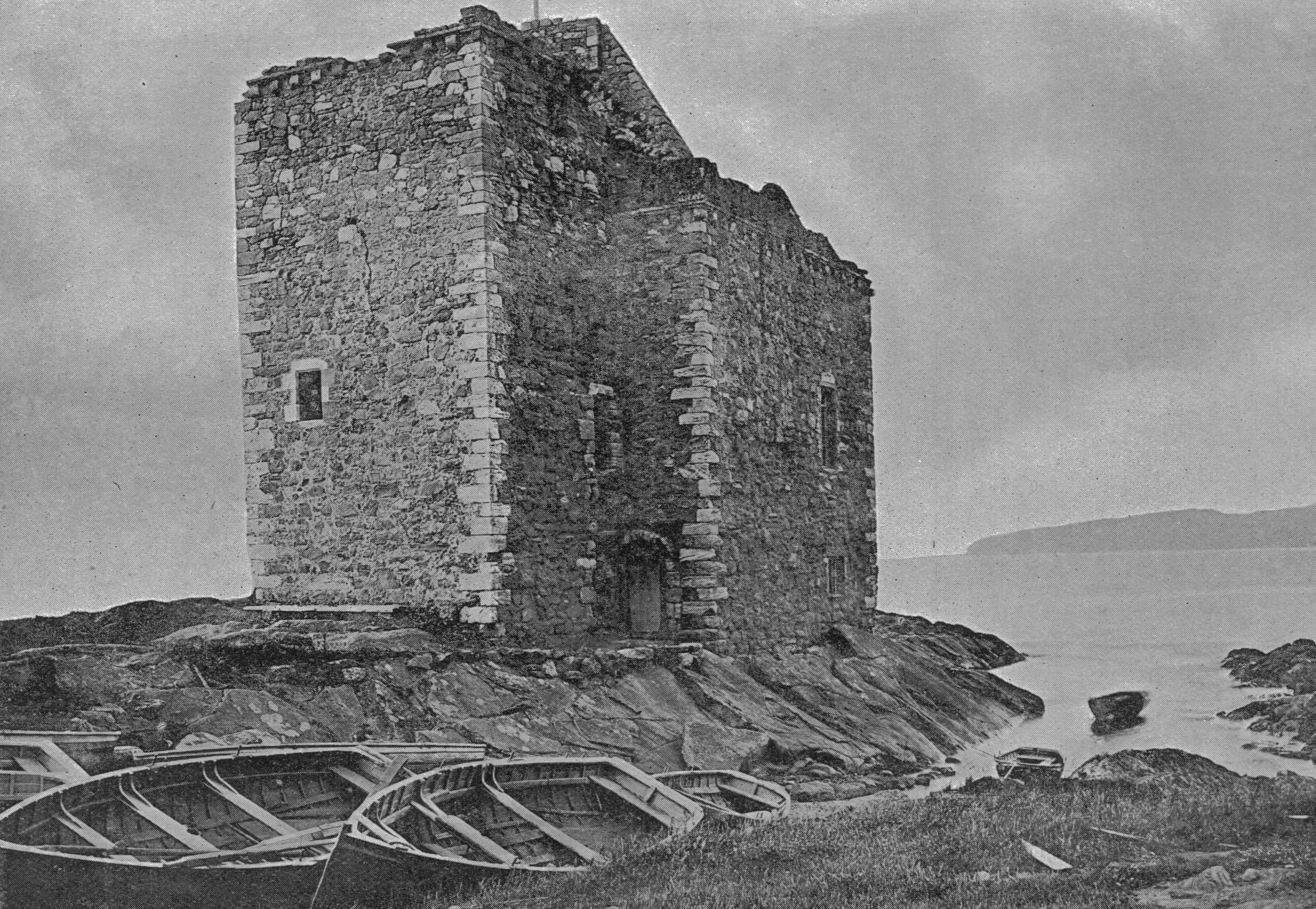
Portencross Castle in 1900.

Preceded by Celynen Collieries' Workingmen's Institute and Memorial Hall – Newbridge	"Restorations" on BBC2; 2004	Succeeded by Hall of Clestrain – Orphir, Orkney
