= Westwell Leacon =

Hamlet in Kent, England

Coordinates: 51.194°N 0.8051°E

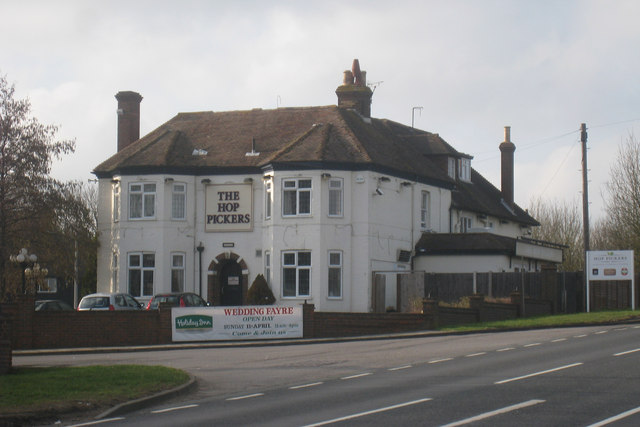
- The Hop Pickers

- Location within Kent
- District: Ashford
- Shire county: Kent
- Region: South East
- Country: England
- Sovereign state: United Kingdom
- Post town: Ashford
- Postcode district: TN26
- Police: Kent
- Fire: Kent
- Ambulance: South East Coast
- UK Parliament: Weald of Kent

Westwell Leacon is a hamlet in the civil parish of Charing near Ashford in Kent, England. Its most famous resident is international Cyclocross star Ian Field.
