= Arthur Ashwell (cricketer, born 1908) =

English cricketer

Personal information
- Full name: Arthur Harry Ashwell
- Born: 2 August 1908; Charing, Kent
- Died: 19 August 1985 (aged 77); Bebington, Cheshire
- Batting: Right-handed
- Bowling: Right-arm medium

Domestic team information
- Years: Team
- 1933–1934: Kent

Career statistics
| Competition | First-class |
|---|---|
| Matches | 4 |
| Runs scored | 42 |
| Batting average | 14.00 |
| 100s/50s | 0/0 |
| Top score | 21* |
| Balls bowled | 222 |
| Wickets | 0 |
| Bowling average | – |
| 5 wickets in innings | – |
| 10 wickets in match | – |
| Best bowling | – |
| Catches/stumpings | 1/– |
- Source: ESPNcricinfo, 3 February 2012

Arthur Harry Ashwell (2 August 1908 – 19 August 1985) was an English cricketer who made four first-class cricket appearances for Kent County Cricket Club in 1933 and 1934. Ashwell was a right-arm fast-medium paced opening bowler. He was born at Charing in Kent.

Ashwell was a young professional on Kent's staff. He first played for the Second XI in 1931, making over 30 appearances for the team in the Minor Counties Championship and taking 40 Second XI wickets in 1933 to "head the Second XI bowling averages". He made his first-class cricket debut for the Kent First XI in the same season against Nottinghamshire in the 1933 County Championship. In a total of four First XI matches for Kent he did not take a wicket and was considered to not be good enough to play regularly for Kent.

Ashwell moved to Merseyside and became the professional at Neston Cricket Club, playing in the Liverpool and District Cricket Competition. He remained in the area and coached young players at the club for "decades". A room in the clubhouse at Parkgate Cricket Ground is named after him.

Ashwell died at Bebington near Birkenhead on the Wirral Peninsula in August 1985 aged 77.

== Bibliography ==
- Carlaw, Derek (2020). Kent County Cricketers, A to Z: Part Two (1919–1939) (PDF). Cardiff: ACS.
