= Charing =

Village in Kent, England

Coordinates: 51.2107°N 0.7949°E

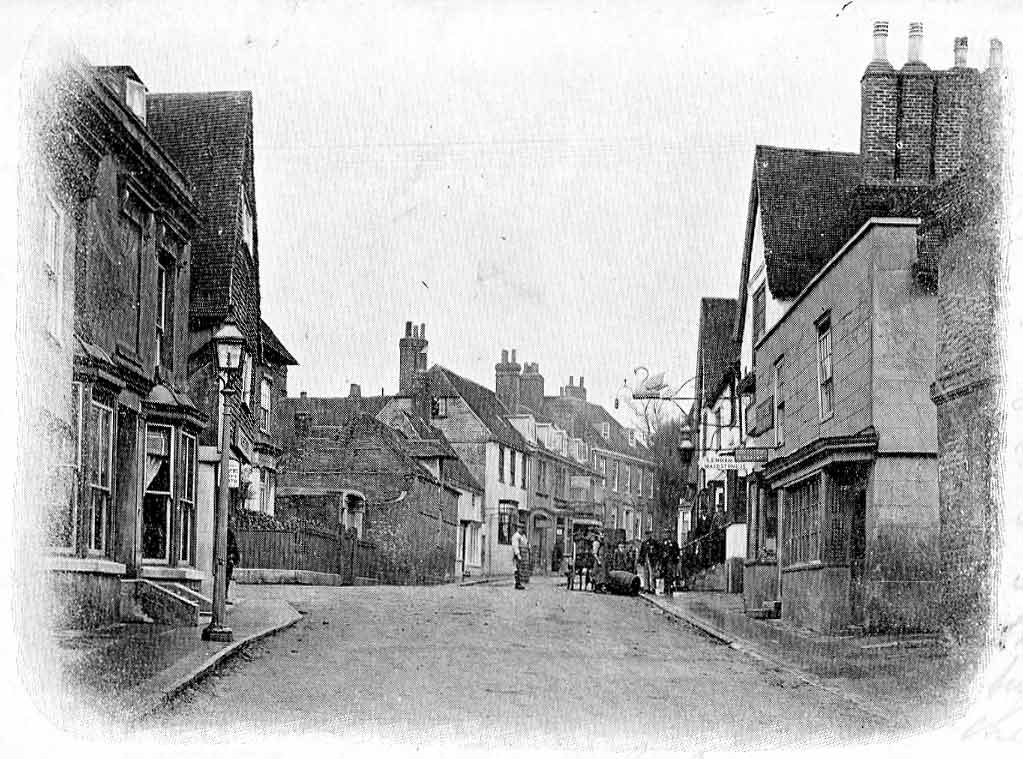
- Charing High Street, c. 1905

- Location within Kent
- Area: 24.9 km^{2} (9.6 sq mi)
- Population: 2,766 (Civil Parish 2011)
  - Density: 111/km^{2} (290/sq mi)
- OS grid reference: TQ953494
- District: Ashford
- Shire county: Kent
- Region: South East
- Country: England
- Sovereign state: United Kingdom
- Post town: Ashford
- Postcode district: TN27
- Dialling code: 01233
- Police: Kent
- Fire: Kent
- Ambulance: South East Coast
- UK Parliament: Weald of Kent

Charing is a village and civil parish in the Ashford district of Kent, in south-east England. It includes the settlements of Charing Heath and Westwell Leacon. It is located at the foot of the North Downs and reaches up to the escarpment. In 2011 the parish had a population of 2,766.

The Pilgrims' Way, the M20 motorway and Charing railway station (between London Victoria and Ashford International via Maidstone) serve the parish.

== History ==
The name Charing first appears in 799 as Ciorrincg. The name probably comes from the Anglo-Saxon word cerring, which means a bend in the road, or it may be from Ceorra-ingas, which is Anglo-Saxon, meaning people of Ceorra. The village is sited on the Pilgrims' Way from London to Canterbury, and is one day's walk from Canterbury. There are a number of old manors located around the village, such as Newlands (now a horse stud) and Pett Place. The village had a market recorded in 1285, and a fair recorded in the fifteenth century.

The Church of St Peter and St Paul, Charing, the parish church of Charing, is situated next to the remains of the Archbishop's Palace, just off the High Street. The church's west tower was built in the 14th century, though most of the rest of the building was reconstructed following a catastrophic fire in the 16th century. The church contains a number of memorials to the Dering family, a branch of the Dering family of Surrenden Dering, Pluckley, Kent.

== Mills ==
Charing has had four mills over the centuries, serving the needs of the villagers. There were two watermills on the Upper Great Stour and two windmills.

Watermills

- Burnt Mill, a corn mill working until the 1950s, now derelict.
- Field Mill, a corn mill, the building of which survives retaining its waterwheel.

Windmills

- Charing Mill, also known as Field Mill on the Downs above the village is a smock mill which was built in the early nineteenth century and last worked in 1891. It stands today as a house conversion.
- Charing Heath Mill was a smock mill that was demolished c.1878. Millers include William Missing in 1845 and Robert Millgate 1862 – 1878

== Places of interest ==
Its most famous building is the Archbishop's Palace, which lies by the church and was an ancient possession of the Archbishop of Canterbury. The palace was an important building in the diocese of Canterbury, and counted amongst its guests King Henry VIII, who took it for himself. It has been a farmhouse for the last 300 years. In 2004, the palace was an unsuccessful contestant in the BBC television programme Restoration, where a number of potential restoration projects throughout the UK competed for funds. The church is said to contain the stone on which John the Baptist was beheaded.

== Amenities ==
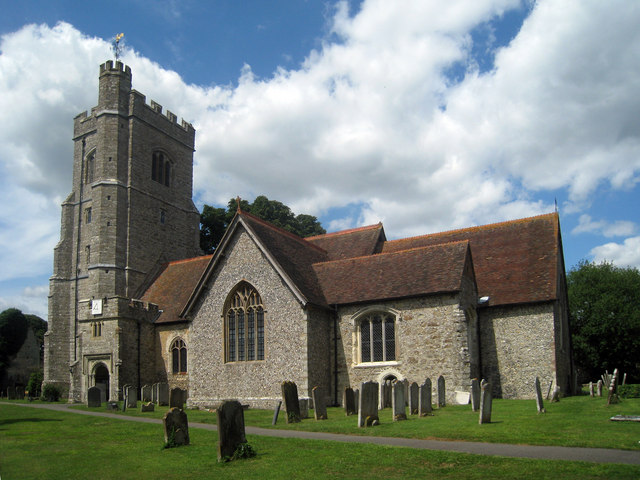
Church of St Peter and St Paul, a grade I listed building

These include:

- C of E Primary School
- Library
- Doctors' surgery
- Independent shops/franchises
- Kentish Tea Room
- Two mid-to-large sized pubs, most of which are listed buildings:
  - The Bowl
  - The Wagon & Horses
- The Kent County Crematorium. At which were cremated 60 Commonwealth service personnel of World War II and the author Charles Hamilton, who as Frank Richards created Billy Bunter. Here also were cremated Archbishops William Temple and Cosmo Gordon Lang.

== Community ==
Housing development since the 1960s has also led to a significant proportion of people employed in London or business parks on the motorway corridors. Groups of residents organise frequent club-based or charity events and fairs. Charing has in the same period revived its Youth Club and cricket team/facilities. There is also a bowls club. A skate park has been added. A Community Warden assists the youths.

== Demography ==
Charing compared
2001 UK Census	Charing	Ashford district	England
Population	2,284	102,661	49,138,831
Foreign born	4.3%	5.5%	9.2%
White	98%	97.6%	90.9%
Asian	0.6%	0.9%	4.6%
Black	0.3%	0.4%	2.3%
Christian	77.4%	76.5%	71.7%
Muslim	0.4%	0.6%	3.1%
Hindu	0%	0.3%	1.1%
No religion	12.6%	14.6%	14.6%
Unemployed	2.2%	2.4%	3.3%
Retired	20.5%	13.8%	13.5%

At the 2001 UK census, the Charing electoral ward had a population of 2,284. The ethnicity was 98% white, 0.7% mixed race, 0.6% Asian, 0.3% black and 0.4% other. The place of birth of residents was 95.7% United Kingdom, 0.5% Republic of Ireland, 1.2% other Western European countries, and 2.6% elsewhere. Religion was recorded as 77.4% Christian, 0.3% Buddhist and 0.2% Jewish, 0.4% Muslim. 12.6% were recorded as having no religion, 0.2% had an alternative religion and 8.8% did not state their religion.

The economic activity of residents aged 16–74 was 32% in full-time employment, 11.9% in part-time employment, 14.3% self-employed, 2.2% unemployed, 1.9% students with jobs, 2.1% students without jobs, 20.5% retired, 7.1% looking after home or family, 4.6% permanently sick or disabled and 3.5% economically inactive for other reasons. The industry of employment of residents was 17.8% retail, 12.9% manufacturing, 8.2% construction, 14.7% real estate, 10.2% health and social work, 7.4% education, 5% transport and communications, 4.1% public administration, 5.1% hotels and restaurants, 4.4% finance, 4.4% agriculture and 5.8% other. Compared with national figures, the ward had a relatively high proportion of workers in agriculture and construction. There were a relatively low proportion in public administration, transport and communications. Of the ward's residents aged 16–74, 18.4% had a higher education qualification or the equivalent, compared with 19.9% nationwide.

== Transport ==
Transport links provided by the A20 London to Dover road, and direct train services to Ashford International and London Victoria via Maidstone East.

There are two bus stops in Charing, with the only bus services running through being the 10X and 124, which runs exclusively as a school bus.

Charing railway station was opened on 1 July 1884, as part of the London, Chatham and Dover Railway (LCDR) extension to Ashford West of the 1874 line to Maidstone, which itself was a branch off the LCDR's Sevenoaks branch of 1862, which joined the LCDR mainline of 1840 at Swanley. In the wake of 1955 British Rail Modernisation plan, the "Kent Coast Electrification" scheme saw the suburban electrification of the previous Southern Railway extended from Maidstone East through to Ashford. Train services are currently operated by Southeastern, with one train in each direction throughout the middle of the day, and an enhanced service during peak periods.

== Notable people ==
- Arthur Ashwell (1908–1985), cricketer
- Frederick Coppins (1889–1963), Canadian soldier, recipient of the Victoria Cross
- Cecil Headlam (1872–1934), cricketer
- Robert Honywood (1601–1686), Member of Parliament
- Jim Moir (born 1959), comedian, artist
- Nancy Sorrell (born 1974), model, actress, television presenter
- Ronald Stuart (1886–1954), Royal Navy Captain, recipient of the Victoria Cross

== In popular culture ==
Scenes from the 2020 film Ammonite were filmed here.
