= Very Annie Mary =

2001 film

- Directed by: Sara Sugarman
- Written by: Sara Sugarman
- Produced by: Graham Broadbent; Damian Jones
- Starring: Rachel Griffiths; Jonathan Pryce; Ioan Gruffudd; Matthew Rhys; Joanna Page
- Cinematography: Barry Ackroyd
- Edited by: Robin Sales
- Music by: Stephen Warbeck
- Distributed by: FilmFour
- Release date: 25 May 2001
- Running time: 104 minutes
- Country: Wales
- Language: English
- Box office: $46,352

Very Annie Mary is a 2001 musical-comedy film, written and directed by Sara Sugarman and starring Rachel Griffiths and Jonathan Pryce. It is a coming-of-age tale, set in south Wales, about a woman in her 30s who lives with her verbally abusive father. It was filmed on location in Bridgend and at Workingman's Institute and Memorial Hall, Newbridge, Wales.

== Premise ==
After her father suffers a stroke, a woman is forced to take care of him but uses the circumstances to emancipate herself and find the courage to sing once again.

== Cast ==
- Rachel Griffiths as Annie Mary Pugh
- Jonathan Pryce as Jack Pugh
- Ioan Gruffudd as Hob
- Matthew Rhys as Nob
- Kenneth Griffith as Minister
- Ruth Madoc as Mrs. Ifans
- Joanna Page as Bethan Bevan
- Anna Mountford as Blodwyn
- Josh Richards as Mr. Bevans
- Cerys Matthews as Nerys

Minor roles in the film are played by Ray Gravell, Mary Hopkin and Ruth Jones, among others.

== Production ==
The film was shot in the middle of 1999, with filming taking place in the Garw Valley in Bridgend, Wales, posing as the fictional village of "Ogw" (a play on the name of the Ogmore Valley's Welsh name of Ogwr). It was scheduled to be presented at the 2000 Sundance Film Festival and the Dinard Festival of British Cinema but failed to show at either event.

== Reception ==
On Rotten Tomatoes, the film holds an approval rating of 34%, based on 29 reviews, with an average rating of 5/10. The website's critical consensus reads, "An exercise in strained whimsy and saccharine sentiment." On Metacritic, the film has a weighted average score of 33 out of 100, based on 10 critics, indicating "generally unfavorable reviews".

Variety called it a "half-klutzy, half-engaging eccentric comedy...bolstered by good turns from leads Rachel Griffiths and Jonathan Pryce" but "falling prey to a general disorganization in tone and structure." The Guardian called it "a broad comedy with a very derivative Monty-ish plot, but likeable and good-natured." The New York Times called the film "alternately mushy and farcical" with an "undertone of satire" that keeps the film from "choking on its own cuteness"; it "churns up a few genuinely funny bits" including a climax "that is almost worth waiting for."
