= Ptolemy Dean =

British architect, author and television presenter (born 1968)

Ptolemy Hugo Dean OBE (born 1968) is a British architect, television presenter and the 19th Surveyor of the Fabric of Westminster Abbey. He specialises in historic preservation, as well as designing new buildings that are in keeping with their historic or natural settings. He is best known for his appearances on two BBC television series, Restoration and The Perfect Village.

== Personal ==
Dean is the son of Jenefer Dean and Joseph Dean, a judge, and the grandson of the actor and impresario Basil Dean; his uncle is the noted musicologist Winton Dean. Ptolemy Dean grew up in Wye in Kent. One of his sisters is called Antigone, the other is the artist Tacita Dean. He attended Kent College, Canterbury.

He studied architecture first at the Bartlett School of Architecture at University College London, then continued with a post-graduate diploma in architecture from the University of Edinburgh. At Edinburgh, Dean studied under the late-modernist Professor Isi Metzstein, building conservation engineer and writer Ted Ruddock and design critic Mike Duriez.

Dean is a reported to have been a favourite of Queen Elizabeth II, and a regular guest of the Royal Family.

== Career ==
=== Architecture ===
After finishing his academic studies, Dean received funding from the International Council on Monuments and Sites (ICOMOS) to document mud adobe structures in New Mexico and Arizona. He then worked for Peter Inskip and Peter Jenkins Architects on a variety of Grade I listed buildings, including Stowe House, Chastleton House and Waddesdon Manor.

Ptolemy completed the Society for the Protection of Ancient Buildings scholarship.

He has worked for a number of Britain's more traditionally influenced architects, including Sir William Whitfield, neo-classicist John Simpson, Sir Frederick Gibberd and Richard Griffiths. At Griffiths', he provided heritage assistance in obtaining planning consent for RHWL architects' post-modern influenced extension to St Pancras Chambers.

He now runs his own small practice, Ptolemy Dean Architects, near Borough Market in London. From March 2012 he has also worked as Surveyor of the Fabric of Westminster Abbey, where in 2018 he designed Weston Tower, a new Gothic lift access to upstairs galleries, the most significant addition to the building since Nicholas Hawksmoor's west towers were completed in 1745, and which was the subject of a profile on the Sky Arts programme The Art of Architecture in 2019.

Dean was appointed Officer of the Order of the British Empire (OBE) in the 2019 Birthday Honours for services to heritage and design.

=== Books ===
Dean has written and illustrated two books on the 19th-century British architect Sir John Soane, and co-written a study of London's historic Borough Market.

=== Television ===
Dean has appeared with Marianne Suhr as the resident "ruin detective" on the BBC Two television programme Restoration. In his seven-episode series The Perfect Village, on BBC Four, Dean visited 12 English villages and discussed the qualities that would create the "perfect village."

=== Art and illustration ===
As seen in his television appearances, Dean produces watercolour cityscapes and architectural renderings or illustrations. These are done in a wobbly line pen and ink technique with evocative colour washes, broadly influenced by the English tradition typified by Samuel Palmer.

== Publications ==
- Dean, Ptolemy. Sir John Soane and the Country Estate (Aldershot: Ashgate, 1999; ISBN 1-84014-293-6).
- Dean, Ptolemy, et al.. The Borough Market Book: From Roots to Renaissance (London: Civic Books, 2004; ISBN 1-904104-90-8).
- Dean, Ptolemy. Sir John Soane and London (Aldershot: Lund Humphries, 2006; ISBN 0-7546-3926-6).
- Dean, Ptolemy. Britain's Buildings: Places & Spaces (London: Dorling Kindersley, 2008; ISBN 978-1-4053-2963-7).
- Dean, Ptolemy. Streetscapes: Historic Routes through English Towns: Navigating Historic English Towns (London: Lund Humphries, 2024; ISBN 978-1848226838).
