= Marianne Suhr =

British television presenter (born c. 1969)

Marianne Suhr MRICS (born c. 1969) is an English Chartered Building Surveyor, writer, and expert on historic buildings. She co-presented the television series Restoration with Ptolemy Dean and Griff Rhys Jones.

== Work ==
Suhr trained with the Society for the Protection of Ancient Buildings and runs training courses for them. She also writes books, and articles for national newspapers and magazines, including contributions to Period Living.

In October 2005, Suhr joined Richard Chartres, Bishop of London at St Giles in the Fields, London, to launch a new maintenance project for the capital's historic churches.

In Restoration, she toured the United Kingdom looking for restoration projects, repairing old buildings, mixing building mud and dowsing.

On her own account, she restored a derelict thatched cottage in Kibworth Beauchamp, Leicestershire, with a friend. On completion of the project, in May 2005, she advised "Don't expect to make money on a project if you're going to do it properly. It involves a lot of time, expensive materials and specialist craftsmen. Estimate the cost and duration of the work, then double both." In 2006, with her partner Richard, she renovated a timber-framed house in Oxfordshire as a home.

On British house-hunters in France, she has said:

There is nothing worse than a Brit banging on about finding a fantastic old French barn for only £20,000 with all of its original features and then they spend the next six months ripping them all out. The problem is we are buying incredibly picturesque homes and then rather bizarrely taking all the wibbly wobbliness out.

== Publications ==
- Urban Renewal Berlin: Experience Examples Prospects (Senate Building and Housing Department, 1991)
- Old House Handbook: a Practical Guide to Care and Repair (with Roger Hunt) (London, Frances Lincoln Publishers, 2008, ISBN 978-0-7112-2772-9)
- Old House Eco Handbook: a Practical Guide to Retrofitting for Energy-Efficiency & Sustainability (with Roger Hunt) (London, Frances Lincoln Publishers, 2013, ISBN 978-0-7112-3278-5)
