= Restoration (TV series) =

- Starring: Griff Rhys Jones, Marianne Suhr, Ptolemy Dean
- Country of origin: United Kingdom
- Original language: English

Production
- Running time: 60 mins (including advertisements)
- Production companies: Banijay (BBC Television)

Original release
- Network: BBC (BBC Two)
- Release: 8 August 2003 – 25 April 2009

Related
- Restoration Home (TV series)

Restoration is a set of BBC television series where viewers decide on which listed building that was in immediate need of remedial works was to win a grant from Heritage Lottery Fund. It first aired in 2003.

The host of all three series is Griff Rhys Jones, whilst investigating each building in the heats are the show's resident "ruin detectives", Marianne Suhr and Ptolemy Dean.

== First series ==
Thirty buildings featured in ten regional heats in 2003, with money raised from the telephone vote being added to the prize fund. Viewers chose which of a selection of the United Kingdom's most important, but neglected, buildings should be awarded a Heritage Lottery Grant of £3m. The winning building was the Victoria Baths in Manchester; however, bureaucratic and technical hurdles meant that the money raised could not be spent immediately, and final planning-approval to begin a restoration process did not go through until September 2005. The first phase of restoration work finally began on 19 March 2007.

Kate Humble co-hosted the 2003 live grand final.

== Second series ==
A second series, featuring 21 buildings in 7 regional heats, appeared on BBC Two in the summer of 2004. The winner was the Old Grammar School and Saracen's Head in Kings Norton, Birmingham. Both buildings closed to the public in July 2006 for archeological investigation, restoration work began in February 2007. Both buildings were officially reopened on 13 June 2008.

The 2004 live Grand Final was co-hosted by Natasha Kaplinsky.

=== Spin offs ===
- Shown in tandem with the series
  - Restored to Glory, BBC Four
  - Restoration Nation, BBC Four
  - Restoration: You Make It Happen, Community Channel

=== Updates ===
On 4 September 2005, Rhys Jones presented a programme, updating viewers as to the progress made by the featured buildings, or otherwise.

== Third series ==
A third series of nine programmes, presented by Griff Rhys Jones, began on BBC Two in August 2006. Entitled Restoration Village, the series focused on buildings in smaller settlements, using the same format and voting as before, featuring 21 buildings in 7 regional heats. Updates about previously featured buildings were also included. The winner of Restoration Village was Chedham's Yard, an early 19th-century blacksmith's yard.

=== Updates ===
On 22 April 2009, Rhys Jones presented "Restoration Revisited", a 60-minute programme updating viewers as to the progress made by some of the 72 featured buildings throughout the three TV series.

== The Perfect Village ==
The Perfect Village was a companion series of architectural travelogues presented by Ptolemy Dean, and shown on BBC Four in 2006. The show chose twelve villages from all around the United Kingdom as illustrations of village life. In the final show Heighington in County Durham was chosen as the UK's "perfect village".

- Show 1. Introduction
- Show 2. Dedham and Alderley Edge (Essex and the North West)
- Show 3. Bourton-on-the-Water and Ardglass (The West and Northern Ireland)
- Show 4. Rogart and Tonyrefail (Scotland and South Wales)
- Show 5. Heighington and Milton Abbas (the North and the South West)
- Show 6. Polperro and Wye (the South West and the South East)
- Show 7. Silver End and Poundbury (the East and the South West)
- Show 8. What makes the perfect village?

== Responses ==
The Channel 4 programme, Demolition, broadcast in December 2005, was an "answer" to Restoration; instead of voting for a building to be saved, viewers were asked to vote on which eyesore should be demolished.

== Music ==
- The main theme music was composed by Nick Franglen, who forms one half of ambient music duo Lemon Jelly. The Lemon Jelly track "In The Bath" was used as background music within the programmes.

== See also ==
- List of Restoration candidates
